= Reification =

Reification may refer to:

== Science and technology ==
- Reification (computer science), the creation of a data model
- Reification (knowledge representation), the representation of facts and/or assertions
- Reification (statistics), the use of an idealized model to make inferences linking results from a model with experimental observations

== Other uses ==
- Reification (fallacy), the fallacy of treating an abstraction as if it were a real thing
- Reification (Gestalt psychology), the perception of an object as having more spatial information than is present
- Reification (information retrieval), the transformation of a natural-language statement such that actions and events represented by it become quantifiable variables
- Reification (Marxism), the consideration of an abstraction of an object as if it had living existence and abilities

== See also ==
- Concretization
- Objectification, the treatment of an entity (such as a human or animal) as an object
