= YSP =

YSP may refer to:

- Yemeni Socialist Party
- Party of the Greens and the Left Future (YSP), a Turkish political party
- Yield spread premium, a cash rebate paid by a lender to a mortgage broker if the broker sells a mortgage at an above-Par interest rate to a borrower
- Yorkshire Sculpture Park, in Yorkshire, England
- FSU Young Scholars Program, a residential science and mathematics program in Florida
- Marathon Aerodrome (IATA code), in Marathon, Ontario, Canada
- Yale shooting problem, a situational logic conundrum formulated at Yale University
- A US Navy hull classification symbol: Salvage barge (YSP)
