= Horizontal transmission =

Means of transmitting infection

Horizontal transmission is the transmission of organisms between biotic and/or abiotic members of an ecosystem that are not in a parent-progeny relationship. Because the evolutionary fate of the agent is not tied to reproductive success of the host, horizontal transmission tends to evolve virulence. It is therefore a critical concept for evolutionary medicine.

== Biological ==
=== Pathogen transmission ===
In biological, but not cultural, transmissions the carriers (also known as vectors) may include other species. The two main biological modes of transmission are anterior station and posterior station. In anterior station, transmission occurs via the bite of an infected organism (the vector), like in malaria, dengue fever, and bubonic plague. Posterior station is transmission via contact with infected feces. Examples are rickettsiae driven diseases (like typhus), which are contracted by a body louse's fecal material being scratched into the bloodstream. The vector is not necessarily another species, however. For example, a dog infected with Rabies may infect another dog via anterior station transmission. Moreover, there are other modes of biological transmission, such as generalized bleeding in ebola.

=== Symbiont transmission ===
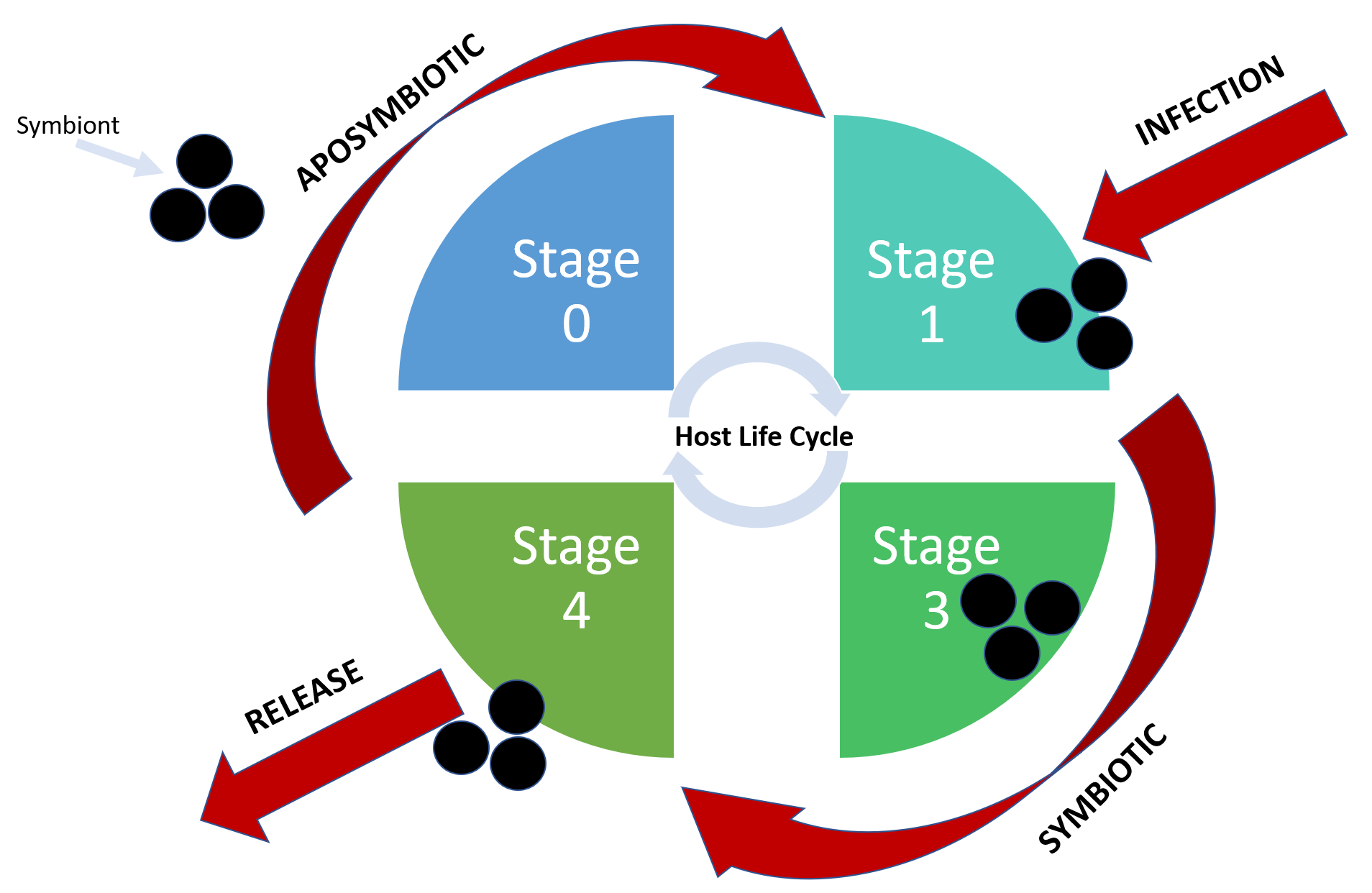
Diagram showing horizontal transmission of a symbiont in its host.

Symbiosis describes a relationship in which at least two organisms are in an intimately integrated state, such that one organism acts a host and the other as the symbiont. There are obligate, those that require the host for survival, and facultative symbionts, those that can survive independently of the host. Symbionts can follow vertical, horizontal, or a mixed mode of transmission to their host. Horizontal, or lateral, transmission describes the acquisition of a facultative symbiont from the environment or from a nearby host.

The life cycle of the host includes both symbiotic and aposymbiotic phases. The aposymbiotic phase generally begins in the germ cells, and during development, the host organism acquires the symbiont and translocates it to a symbiont-housing organ. The host will release the symbiont before reproduction.

Determining the transmission mode of a symbiont requires identifying the key aspects that define transmission. For horizontal transmission one would need to check the host at each life stage for the presence of the symbiont and determine whether the symbiont is released from the host into the environment. In hydrothermal vent tubeworms, release of a symbiont upon host death was demonstrated using a symbiont recruitment plates and fluorescence in situ hybridization (FISH). Each life cycle stage of the tubeworm was sampled and examined also using FISH to determine the aposymbiotic and acquisition life cycle stages as larvae and settled larvae >250μm in length.

Implications of horizontal transmission include the critical need for specificity in recognition and acquisition methods and the larger genetic diversity maintained by the symbiont species. Recognition specificity can be achieved through complex signaling through the release of hormones, such as with Rhizobia species and legumes. The release of the symbiont allows it to exchange genetic material with external microbes as well as between the genetically diverse individuals within the host. This maintaining of genetic exchange allows for the symbiont's host range to be extended and the selection for new functionality or adaptations of hosts, symbionts, and holobiont.

An example of a horizontally transmitted symbiont with a high specificity recognition and acquisition method is the Rhizobia-Legume symbiosis. The establishment of the symbiosis begins with the aposymbiotic plant releasing flavinoids that are detected by a specific Rhizobium species and triggers the induction of nod genes in the bacterium. Nod factors, which are lipooligosaccharide signals, are released as a result of the expression of the nod genes and when detected by the host plant initiate root nodule formation which eventually trap the Rhizobia. The established symbiosis can be further contained in a symbiosome in which the Rhizobia symbionts reside and carry out the nitrogen-fixation.

== Anthropological ==
Cultural transmission may also be horizontal which is explicitly reified in Dual Inheritance Theory. Horizontal transmission is implicit in the meme theory of cultural evolution, where the "meme" has been characterized by Richard Dawkins as a "Virus of the Mind".

== See also ==
- Horizontal disease transmission
- Horizontal gene transmission
- Vertical transmission
