= Fluent (disambiguation) =

Fluent is an adjective related to fluency, the ability to communicate in a language quickly and accurately.

Fluent or fluency may also refer to:

- Fluent (mathematics), in mathematics, a continuous function
- Fluent (artificial intelligence), in artificial intelligence, a condition that varies over time
- Fluent calculus, a formalism for manipulating fluents
- Fluent, Inc., a company that develops software for computational fluid dynamics
- Fluent interface, a software engineering object-oriented construct
- Fluent (user interface), introduced in the 2007 Microsoft Office system
- Fluent Design System, a design language developed by Microsoft in 2017
- Fluentd, open source data collection software
- Fluency (handwriting), an aspect of handwriting ability

== See also ==
- Fluenz (language learning software), a digital language learning platform
