= Gabbay =

Gabbay may refer to:

- Gabbai, a person who assists in running a synagogue

Awards
people

- Avi Gabbay, an Israeli politician and the current leader of the Israeli Labor Party
- Dov Gabbay (born 1945), British mathematical logician and computer scientist
- Hamid Gabbay, Iranian-born American architect
- Yisroel Meir Gabbai, a Breslover Hasid who travels the world to locate, repair and maintain Jewish cemeteries and kevarim (gravesites) of Torah notables

Math

- Gabbay's separation theorem, a term in mathematical logic and computer science, named after Dov Gabbay

Logic

- Gabbay-makinson conditions (Rational consequence relation), a term in Logic
