= Qualification problem =

In philosophy and AI (especially, knowledge-based systems), the qualification problem is concerned with the impossibility of listing all the preconditions required for a real-world action to have its intended effect. It might be posed as how to deal with the things that prevent me from achieving my intended result. It is strongly connected to, and opposite the ramification side of, the frame problem. John McCarthy gives the following motivating example, in which it is impossible to enumerate all the circumstances that may prevent a robot from performing its ordinary function:

[T]he successful use of a boat to cross a river requires, if the boat is a rowboat, that the oars and rowlocks be present and unbroken, and that they fit each other. Many other qualifications can be added, making the rules for using a rowboat almost impossible to apply, and yet anyone will still be able to think of additional requirements not yet stated.

== See also ==
- Non-monotonic logic
- Circumscription
