= Erik Sandewall =

Swedish computer scientist

- Born: 24 oktober 1945; Oskarshamn, Sweden
- Died: 5 april 2024
- Citizenship: Sweden
- Education: Uppsala University
- Known for: Artificial Intelligence
- Awards: AAAI Fellow
- Scientific career
- Fields: Computer Science; Artificial Intelligence
- Workplaces: Linköping University

Erik Sandewall was a Swedish Professor in the Chair of Computer Science at Linköping University since 1975. He is known for his pioneering research in artificial intelligence.

== Education ==
Erik Sandewall received the B.A. and Ph.D. degrees from Uppsala University in 1964 and 1969 respectively.

== Notable Honors and Awards ==
- AAAI Fellow
- ECCAI Fellow
- Member of the Royal Swedish Academy of Engineering Sciences (1981)
- Member of the Swedish Academy of Sciences (1992)
- Doctor honoris causa Paul Sabatier University, France
- Chevalier of the Legion of Honor, France
- Fellow of the German Research Centre for Artificial Intelligence
- Associate Member of the Hassan II Academy of Science and Technology, Morocco
- Immortalized as statue outside of the Department of Computer and Information Science, Linköping University

== See also ==
- Frame problem
- Yale shooting problem
- Funarg problem
