= Bernard Meltzer (computer scientist) =

British computer scientist

- Born: 1916; South Africa
- Died: 4 July 2008 (aged 91–92)
- Scientific career
- Doctoral advisor: Reinhold Furth
- Doctoral students: Pat Hayes; Robert Kowalski

Bernard Meltzer (born in 1916 in South Africa; died on 4 July 2008) was a British computer scientist, who with Donald Michie was one of the main founders of research on artificial intelligence at the University of Edinburgh.

Meltzer studied physics at the University of Cape Town with a bachelor's degree in 1934, and was briefly a physics demonstrator in Cape Town. He emigrated to Great Britain, where he worked for the Marconi Company and, after the start of the Second World War, for the Telecommunications Research Establishment conducting research on radar. In 1941 he enlisted in the Royal Air Force Volunteer Reserve and from 1943 taught radar and electronics to military personnel at the University of Aberdeen. After the war he went into industry (Mullard's Radio Valve Company, from 1949 in the research laboratories of EMI). In 1953 he received his doctorate from the University of London in mathematical physics with Reinhold Furth (1893–1979). In 1955 he became a lecturer and later a reader in the electrical engineering department of the University of Edinburgh, doing research in electronics (both semiconductors and tubes). His research on ion propulsion resulted in an invitation from NASA to Stanford University in 1962.

Meltzer also had an interest in mathematical logic and began to work in computer science and artificial intelligence. 1964/65 he worked at the Atlas Computer Laboratory of the Science Research Council and then founded the Metamathematics Unit at the University of Edinburgh. The focus of the Unit was on automatic proof methods. In 1972 he received the chair of Computational Logic (corresponding to the name of the new department, which succeeded the Metamathematics Unit). From 1974 to 1977 he was head of the Department of Artificial Intelligence. In 1978 he retired.

Edinburgh became a center of artificial intelligence under him and Donald Michie, with scientists such as Robert Kowalski (who was one of the founders of logic programming in the early 1970s) and Alan Bundy. J Strother Moore (who received his doctorate there in 1973), Robert S. Boyer (visiting scholar 1971 to 1973) and Pat Hayes (like Robert Kowalski, his doctoral student).

With Donald Michie he published the series Machine Intelligence (Volumes 4 to 7) from 1969 to 1972.

In 1979 he received the first Donald E. Walker Distinguished Service Award.
