= Michael Holmes (politician) =

British politician (1938–2023)

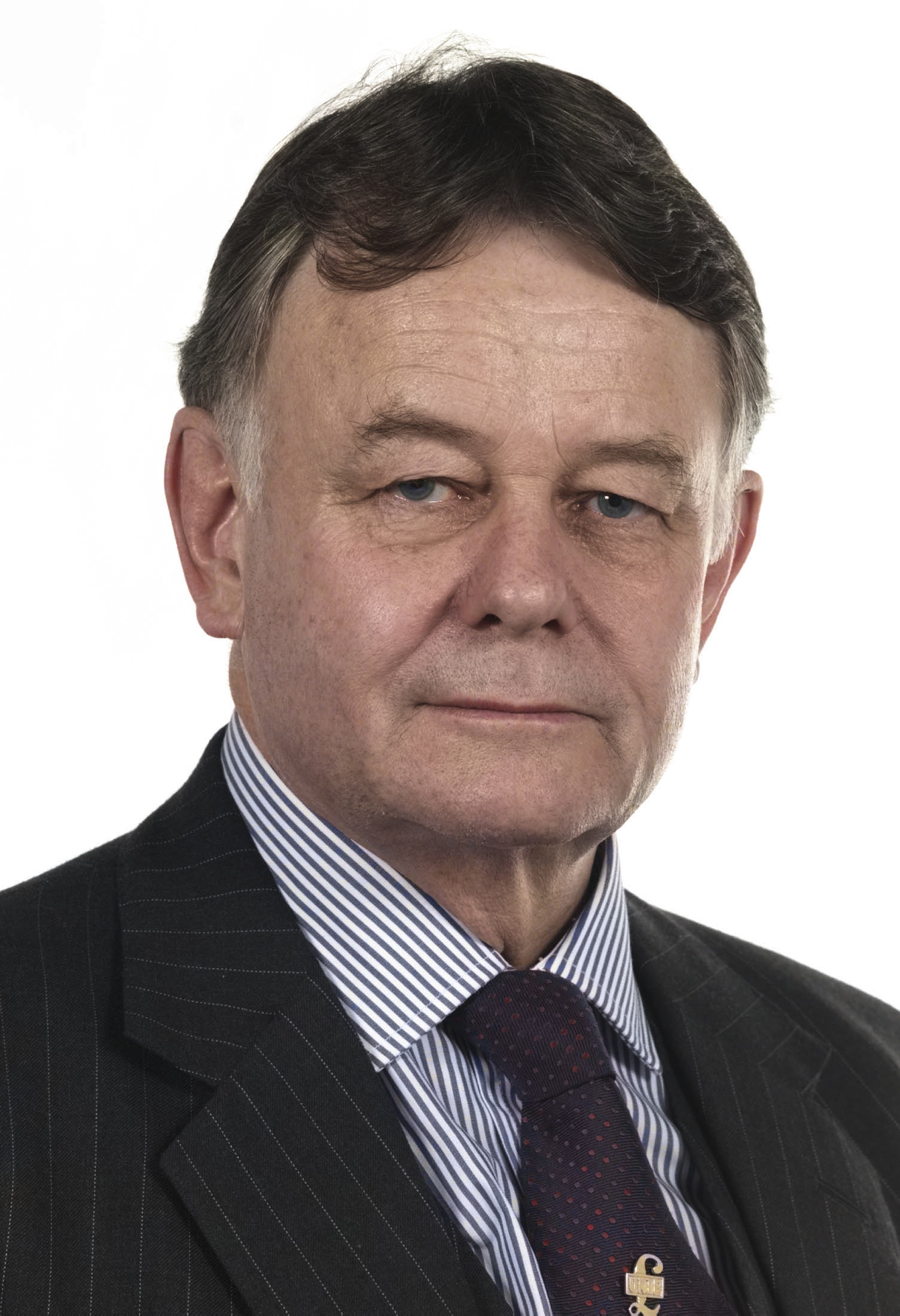

Leader of the UK Independence Party
- In office September 1997 – 22 January 2000
- Deputy: Craig Mackinlay; Graham Booth
- Preceded by: Craig Mackinlay (acting)
- Succeeded by: Jeffrey Titford

Member of the European Parliament for South West England
- In office 15 July 1999 – 15 December 2002
- Preceded by: Position established
- Succeeded by: Graham Booth

Personal details
- Born: 6 June 1938 Farnborough, Hampshire, England
- Died: 29 September 2023 (aged 85)
- Party: UK Independence Party (until 2000)

Michael John Holmes (6 June 1938 – 29 September 2023) was a British politician who was leader of the UK Independence Party (UKIP) from 1997 to 2000. He served as a Member of the European Parliament (MEP) for South West England from 1999 to 2002.

== Life and career ==
Holmes was born in Farnborough, Hampshire on 6 June 1938. He was educated at Sevenoaks School.

At the 1997 general election, Holmes unsuccessfully contested the New Forest West constituency. Later that year, he was elected leader of UKIP. In 1999, he and two other UKIP candidates were elected to the European Parliament at the election of 1999 and in his maiden speech there he made some comments in defiance of party policy:

This Parliament does not appear to be very democratic... To get a democratic structure, we have to change over the years so that Parliament is not the servant of the Commission but the Commission is the servant of the elected representatives of the electorate of Europe. It would be better if the future of Europe was entrusted to elected representatives who can be dismissed from office at elections and not to nominated bureaucrats in the form of Commissioners... If Mr Prodi and his colleagues wish to remedy Euro-scepticism and Euro-apathy, I am calling for true democracy and for the elected representatives to have much more authority over the programme and policies of this institution.

Following the European Parliament election, UKIP suffered from rivalry between groups supporting Holmes, the leader, and Nigel Farage, the party chairman, both now MEPs. At a National Executive Committee meeting later that year, Holmes dismissed Craig Mackinlay as his deputy and Tony Scholefield as Party Secretary. This prompted an immediate vote of no confidence in Holmes, who the following month agreed to resign. A party conference also voted no confidence in him, and in January 2000 he resigned as leader. Jeffrey Titford was then elected as the new leader.

Holmes left the party, but continued to sit as an independent MEP until 2002, when he resigned his seat and was replaced by Graham Booth, who had been the next candidate on the UKIP party list for South West England.

Holmes died on 29 September 2023, at the age of 85.

Party political offices
Preceded by Craig Mackinlay	Leader of the United Kingdom Independence Party; 1997–2000	Succeeded by Jeffrey Titford
