= Pat Hayes =

Computer science researcher in artificial intelligence

- Born: Patrick John Hayes; 21 August 1944 (age 82); Newent, Gloucestershire, UK
- Citizenship: UK
- Education: Bentley Grammar School
- Alma mater: University of Cambridge (BA); University of Edinburgh (PhD)
- Known for: Naive Physics Manifesto
- Awards: AAAI Fellow (1990)
- Scientific career
- Fields: Computer Science
- Workplaces: Florida Institute for Human & Machine Cognition; University of Cambridge; University of Edinburgh; University of Illinois at Urbana-Champaign; University of Rochester; University of Essex
- Thesis: Semantic trees: new foundations for automatic theorem proving (1973)
- Doctoral advisor: Bernard Meltzer
- Website: ihmc.us/groups/phayes

Patrick John Hayes (born 21 August 1944) is a British computer scientist who lives and works in the United States. He is a Senior Research Scientist Emeritus at the Institute for Human and Machine Cognition (IHMC) in Pensacola, Florida.

== Education ==
Hayes was educated at the Bentley Grammar School, Calne. He studied the Cambridge Mathematical Tripos and received a Bachelor of Arts degree in mathematics from the University of Cambridge in 1966 and a PhD in artificial intelligence with the thesis 'Semantic trees: New foundations for automatic theorem-proving' from the University of Edinburgh in 1973.

== Career ==
After leaving Edinburgh in 1973, Hayes held an academic appointment in the Department of Computer Science at the University of Essex (1973–80). He immigrated to the US in 1981, to become the Luce Professor of Cognitive Science in the Departments of Computer Science, Philosophy and Psychology at the University of Rochester (1981–85), where he was Chair of the Cognitive Sciences Cluster. In 1985, he left Rochester for California, to join the Schlumberger Palo Alto Research Center (1985–87), Xerox-PARC (1987–90) and the Microelectronics and Computer Technology Corporation (1991–92), where he was Director of the CYC-West project. During this period, he also held a number of parallel positions as Visiting Scholar CSLI, Stanford University and Consulting Professor Department of Computer Science, Stanford (1985–94). In 1992 he became a research professor in the Departments of Computer Science and Philosophy, and the Beckmann Institute, University of Illinois at Urbana-Champaign (1992–96). In 1996, he became Senior Research Scientist at IHMC (1996–2009) and John C. Pace Distinguished Scholar at the University of West Florida (1996–2001). He became Senior Research Scientist Emeritus at IHMC in 2009.

== Research ==
Hayes has been an active, prolific, and influential figure in artificial intelligence for over five decades. He has a reputation for being provocative but also quite humorous.

One of his earliest publications, with John McCarthy, was the first thorough statement of the basis for the AI field of logical knowledge representation, introducing the notion of situation calculus, representation and reasoning about time, fluents, and the use of logic for representing knowledge in a computer.

Hayes next major contribution was the seminal work on the Naive Physics Manifesto, which anticipated the expert systems movement in many ways and called for researchers in AI to actually try to represent knowledge in computers. Although not the first to mention the word "ontology" in computer science, Hayes was one of the first to actually do it, and inspired an entire generation of researchers in knowledge engineering, logical formalisations of commonsense reasoning, and ontology.

In the middle of the 1990s, while serving as president of the AAAI, Hayes began a series of attacks on critics of AI, mostly phrased in an ironic light, and (together with his colleague Kenneth Ford) invented an award named after Simon Newcomb to be given for the most ridiculous argument "disproving" the possibility of AI. The Newcomb Awards are announced in the AI Magazine published by AAAI.

At the turn of the century he became active in the Semantic Web community, contributing substantially (perhaps solely) to the revised semantics of RDF known as RDF-Core, one of the three designers (along with Peter Patel-Schneider and Ian Horrocks) of the Web Ontology Language semantics, and most recently contributed to SPARQL. He is also, along with philosopher Christopher Menzel the primary designer of the ISO Common Logic standard.

Hayes has served as secretary of AISB (1968–79), chairman and trustee of IJCAI (1980–84), associate editor of the Artificial Intelligence Journal (1979–86), a governor of the Cognitive Science Society (1983–86) and president of AAAI (1991–93). Hayes is a Charter Fellow of AAAI and of the Cognitive Science Society.

According to his website, his research interests include "knowledge representation and automatic reasoning, especially the representation of space and time; the semantic web; ontology design; and the philosophical foundations of AI and computer science". "In his spare time, He restores antique mechanical clocks and remodels old houses. He is also a practicing artist, with works exhibited in local competitions and international collections." He also has "professional competence in domestic plumbing, carpentry and electrical work".
