= Bentley's School, Calne =

Former school in Calne, England

Coordinates: 51.4285°N 2.0027°W

Bentley's School, Calne, in Calne, Wiltshire, England, was a school founded in 1660 by John Bentley and closed in 1974 by Wiltshire County Council.

At different times it was known as the Bentley Grammar School and Calne County School.

== Origins ==
By his will dated 29 September 1660, John Bentley, of Richmond, Surrey, left one sixth of a field called Ficketts, near Lincoln's Inn, London, and a rent-charge of £12 a year on another part of the same field, for the founding of what he called "a free English School" at Calne, and appointed three trustees to make the necessary arrangements. It is unclear why he chose Calne, although one of his trustees, William Penniger, bore a Wiltshire name.

== History ==
In 1665 a house and garden on the Green at Calne were bought and remained the school's home until 1833.

In 1683, the new school became a grammar school, on the orders of the Commissioners of Charitable Uses, who required Latin to be taught.

In 1690, the land near Lincoln's Inn was sold for £1,200, although only four of the six trustees transacted the sale. Investing some of the money in a mortgage led to a Court of Chancery claim in 1727 which was not settled until 1742. They trustees came out of this with enough money to buy annuities worth £50 a year on land near Chippenham and to put £300 into Consols.

In 1734, Sir Francis Bridgman gave the school two exhibitions to be held at the Queen's College, Oxford, and the trustees gave instructions that at least seven boys were to be taught both Latin and Greek.

In 1833, the Consols were sold to provide a new schoolroom and master's house. In 1834, the Brougham Commissioners reported that Bentley's had ceased to be a classical school and that no Bridgman Exhibition had been claimed for thirty years. In 1836, the income was too small to hire a competent classical schoolmaster, and the trustees began to charge school fees. H.M. Inspector of Schools found in 1846 and 1847 that the teaching was good.

In 1861, a government grant to the school was stopped, because the level of the fees was too high for it to continue. In 1868, the Schools Inquiry Commission reported that the school was teaching book-keeping, Euclid, and surveying and was "good as far as it goes", but that there were only 41 boys, aged from eight to fourteen.

In the 1890s, the Charity Commissioners reorganized Bentley's School by lowering the fees and bringing in commercial and science subjects, including chemistry, a modern language, and agriculture, and making it a school for boys from eight to sixteen. In 1901, it was combined with a technical institute and became the Calne County School. Girls were admitted but at first were taught in another house on the Green. In 1909 a new school building was built and classes became co-educational.

By 1934 it was clear that the school suffered from being neither a higher elementary school or a grammar school, and that more up-to-date courses were needed. A new headmaster, Mr. M. S. Gotch, was able to make a better sixth form for the arts and sciences by renting extra rooms around the town for classrooms.

Following the Education Act 1944, the school accepted voluntary controlled status, meaning that it had little autonomy. In 1946, the County Council bought a site at Wessington for a new school building and a boarding house, not built by 1952.

In 1947 the school was renamed as the Bentley Grammar School.

In 1974, Wiltshire County Council decided to close the school and establish a new comprehensive school in its place. The Wessington site is now occupied by Kingsbury Green Academy.

== Notable former pupils ==
- Pat Hayes (born 1944), computer scientist
- Julia Reid (born 1952), former Member of the European Parliament
