= Trevor Colman =

British politician (1941–2022)

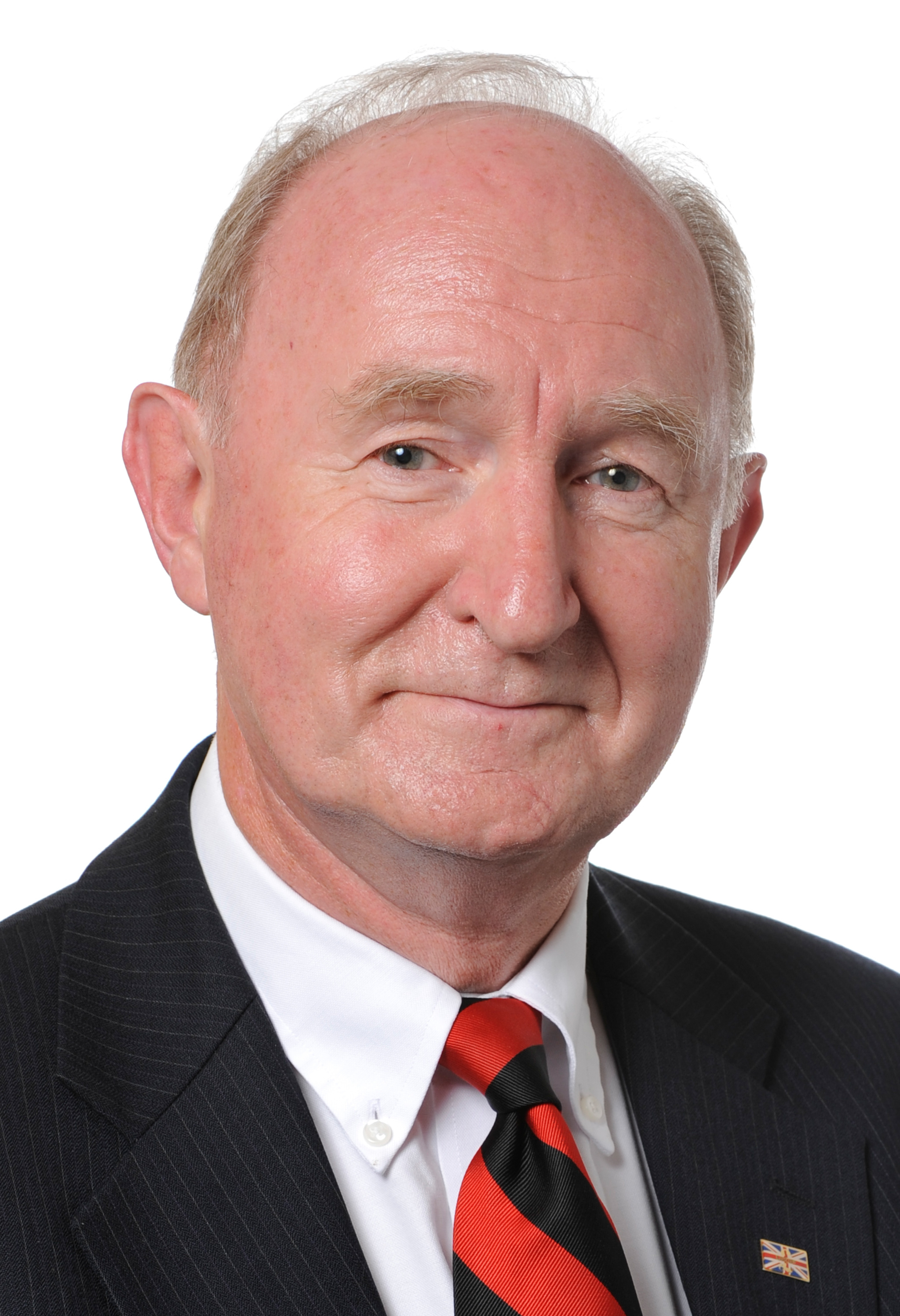

Member of the European Parliament for South West England
- In office 1 October 2008 – 26 May 2014
- Preceded by: Graham Booth
- Succeeded by: Julia Reid

Personal details
- Born: 27 August 1941 St Breward, Cornwall, England
- Died: 22 March 2022 (aged 80) Dawlish, Devon, England
- Party: UK Independence Party

Bernard Trevor Colman (27 August 1941 – 22 March 2022) was a UK Independence Party politician. He was a Member of the European Parliament (MEP) for South West England.

== Biography ==
Colman was born in St Breward, Cornwall, and had a grammar school education at Sir James Smith's Grammar School, Camelford, and Tavistock Grammar School. After leaving school, he had a varied career, working in a farm suppliers company, in a magistrate's clerk's office, and as a serving police officer (rising to the rank of Superintendent) (1962–1995). Following his retirement from the police he worked as a script adviser (1994–1998) to the television detective series Wycliffe.

Colman served on the UKIP National Executive Committee between 2004 and 2005.

He presented a programme called European Union: Shock Waves for Life TV in 2004. Life TV's owners were fined £12,000 by regulators Ofcom because of a lack of impartiality and failure to present alternative viewpoints.

Colman was listed third on UKIP's list in the South West region in the European Parliament elections in 2004. UKIP took 22.6% of the vote in the region and their top two candidates, Graham Booth and Roger Knapman were elected to the European Parliament. On 1 October 2008, Graham Booth retired and was therefore replaced in the Parliament by Trevor Colman as the next candidate on the list. For the 2009 election, Colman was the first candidate on the UKIP list.

He contested the 2005 general election for the constituency of Teignbridge and came fourth, with 6.4% of the vote.

In the European Parliament, Mr Colman sat on the Committee on International Trade and is a substitute for the Committee on Constitutional Affairs.

In March 2011, Colman left the Europe of Freedom and Democracy group which includes UKIP, allegedly due to an "unresolved dispute over financial and staffing issues." However Colman continued to represent UKIP as a Non-Inscrit.

Colman resigned at the 2014 European election.

Colman died following a long illness on 22 March 2022, at the age of 81.
