= Ramification problem =

In philosophy and artificial intelligence (especially, knowledge based systems), the ramification problem is concerned with the indirect consequences of an action. It might also be posed as how to represent what happens implicitly due to an action or how to control the secondary and tertiary effects of an action. It is strongly connected to, and is opposite the qualification side of, the frame problem.

Limit theory helps in operational usage. For instance, in KBE derivation of a populated design (geometrical objects, etc., similar concerns apply in shape theory), equivalence assumptions allow convergence where potentially large, and perhaps even computationally indeterminate, solution sets are handled deftly. Yet, in a chain of computation, downstream events may very well find some types of results from earlier resolutions of ramification as problematic for their own algorithms.

== See also ==
- Non-monotonic logic
- Ramification (mathematics)
