= Craig Mackinlay =

British politician (born 1966)

The Right Honourable The Lord Mackinlay of Richborough JP
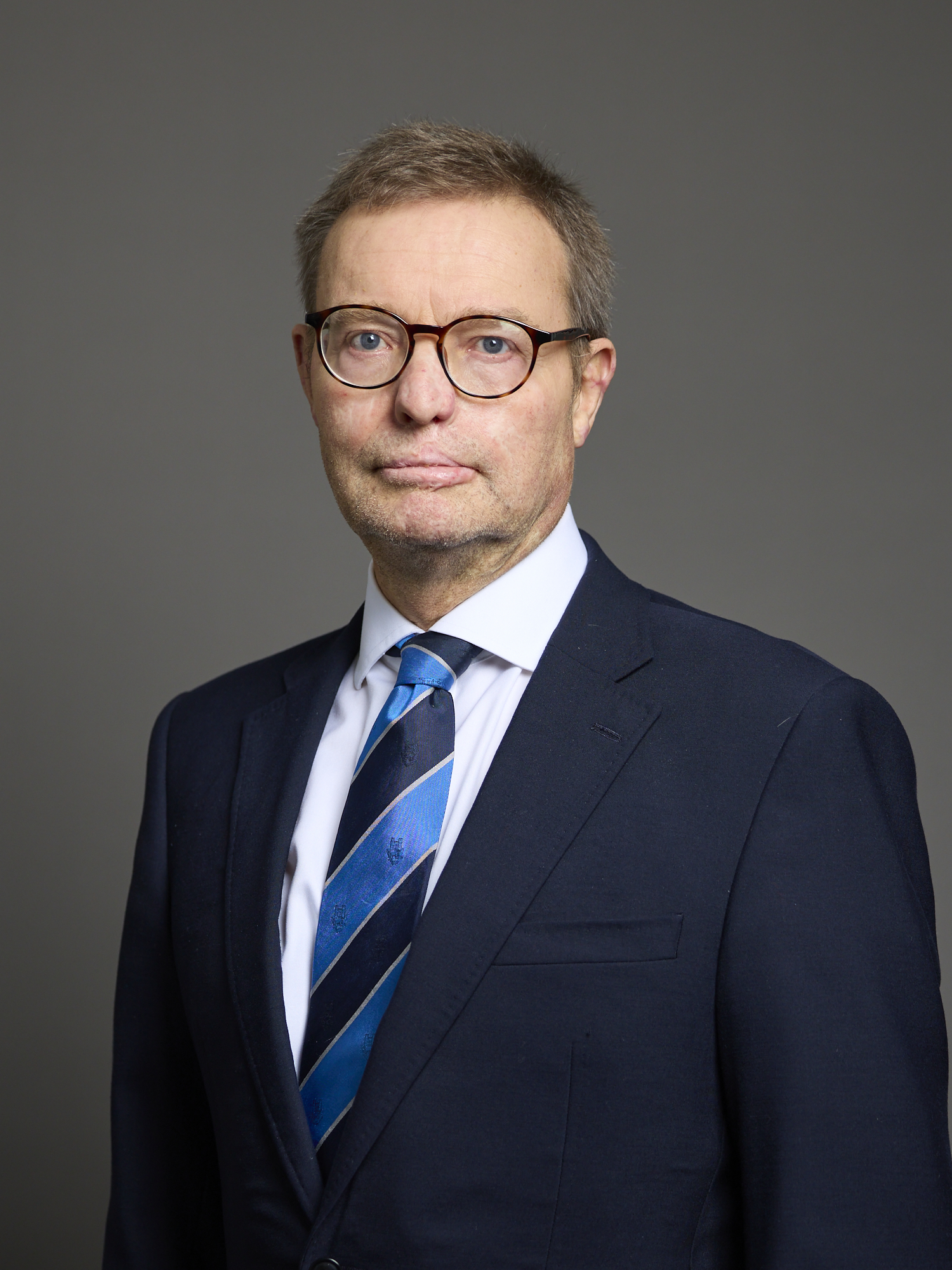
- Official portrait, 2025

Member of the House of Lords
- Lord Temporal
- Life peerage 23 August 2024

Member of Parliament for South Thanet
- In office 7 May 2015 – 30 May 2024
- Preceded by: Laura Sandys
- Succeeded by: Polly Billington (East Thanet (Note: The South Thanet constituency was renamed "East Thanet" at the 2024 general election, with moderate boundary changes.))

Member of Medway Council for River
- In office 3 May 2007 – 7 May 2015

Deputy Leader of the UK Independence Party
- In office September 1997 – 22 January 2000
- Leader: Michael Holmes
- Preceded by: Position established
- Succeeded by: Graham Booth

Leader of the UK Independence Party
- Acting; 6 August 1997 – September 1997
- Preceded by: Alan Sked
- Succeeded by: Michael Holmes

Treasurer of the UK Independence Party
- In office 3 September 1993 – 6 August 1997
- Leader: Alan Sked
- Preceded by: Position established
- Succeeded by: Andrew Smith

Personal details
- Born: Craig Mackinlay; 7 October 1966 (age 60) Chatham, Kent, England
- Party: Conservative (2005–present)
- Other political affiliations: UK Independence Party (1993–2005)
- Spouse: Kati Madi (m. 2011)
- Children: 1
- Education: University of Birmingham (BSc)

Craig Mackinlay, Baron Mackinlay of Richborough (born 7 October 1966) is a British Conservative Party politician and businessman. He was Member of Parliament (MP) for South Thanet from 2015 to 2024.

Initially a member of the UK Independence Party (UKIP), Mackinlay served as the deputy leader of UKIP from 1997 to 2000 and the acting leader of UKIP in 1997, before joining the Conservative Party in 2005.

In the 2015 general election, Mackinlay was elected to the House of Commons in South Thanet a Conservative candidate, defeating Nigel Farage, then leader of UKIP. As an MP, Mackinlay was a member of the Brexit Select Committee and the Common Sense Group.

Mackinlay underwent a quadruple amputation following an infection of sepsis in 2023. He stood down as an MP at the 2024 general election and was appointed to the House of Lords.

Since 2025, he has been Director of the Global Warming Policy Foundation.

== Early life ==
Mackinlay was born on 7 October 1966 in Chatham and raised in Kent. His parents, Colin and Margaret Mackinlay, were both born in Kent. After attending Rainham Mark Grammar School, he studied zoology and comparative physiology at the University of Birmingham, graduating with a Bachelor of Science (BSc) degree. He qualified as a chartered accountant (FCA) and a chartered tax adviser (CTA), and later became a partner in a Kent firm.

== Political background ==
Mackinlay first became engaged in politics after observing the impact of Britain's membership, between October 1990 and September 1992, of the European Exchange Rate Mechanism. After hearing Alan Sked, a professor at the London School of Economics, speak on a BBC politics programme, he made contact and attended a meeting at the LSE. He was then persuaded to stand at the April 1992 general election as an independent in support of the Anti-Federalist League, receiving 248 votes in Gillingham.

=== UKIP ===
When the Anti-Federalist League evolved into the UK Independence Party (UKIP), Mackinlay was appointed its founding treasurer and Vice-Chairman. He stood again in Gillingham at the 1997 general election, receiving 590 votes.

In July 1997, Sked resigned as UKIP leader, nominating Mackinlay as his successor. Mackinlay decided to rework its constitution and hold a leadership election. Mackinlay stood in the election against Michael Holmes and Gerald Roberts. Holmes, with the backing of Nigel Farage, won and appointed Mackinlay as his deputy.

Following the European Parliament election in 1999, Holmes dismissed Mackinlay and Party Secretary Tony Scholefield at a National Executive Committee (NEC) meeting, which prompted a vote of no confidence in Holmes, who agreed to resign the following month. Jeffrey Titford was elected as the new party leader; Mackinlay stepped down as deputy, but remained on its NEC.

Mackinlay remained active in UKIP, standing in Totnes at the 2001 general election, at which he received 6.1% of the vote, then in Gillingham in 2005, where he polled 2.6%. He also stood in the 1994, 1999 and 2004 European elections.

=== Conservative Party ===
In July 2005, Mackinlay defected from UKIP to the Conservative Party. He was elected as a Conservative councillor on Medway Council in 2007 and re-elected in May 2011 with an increased majority.

In 2010, he disputed with Kent Police over Special Constable David Craggs, who was advised that there would be no conflict with him standing for election to Medway Council but, after being elected as a councillor, was informed that he could not hold both roles. In May 2011, Mackinlay was appointed a member of Kent Police Authority.

In June 2012, Mackinlay was selected as the Conservative candidate for the office of Kent Police and Crime Commissioner. In the November 2012 county-wide poll, he lost to the former Kent Police Authority chair Ann Barnes, by a 114,137–60,248 margin, on a turnout of just under 16%.

In 2015, Mackinlay was elected as Member of Parliament for South Thanet at the general election, where he stood against UKIP leader Nigel Farage and comedian Al Murray, among others. Conservative Laura Sandys had represented the constituency in the House of Commons since the 2010 general election and retired after one term in Parliament.

In October 2017, Mackinlay said "unemployed young people from Glasgow should get on their bikes and work with gorgeous EU women on farms in the south of England after Brexit." Labour MSP James Kelly responded that the comments were "abhorrent and offensive", while Jenny Gilruth MSP said that the comments were "sexist and patronising".

In June 2018 it was reported that Mackinlay had been found to have twice breached parliament's rules due to a potential financial interest, according to a decision by its standards watchdog. The MP had used his position to press for the reopening of an airport from which his company had planned to run low-cost flights. Mackinlay responded that he no longer had plans for running flights from Manston Airport and that there "was no suggestion he benefited financially from raising the matter in the Commons."

In the House of Commons, Mackinlay sat on the Committee on Exiting the European Union. He has previously sat on the Work and Pensions Select Committee and European Scrutiny Committee.

Following an interim report on the connections between colonialism and properties now in the care of the National Trust, including links with historic slavery, Mackinlay was among the signatories of a letter in November 2020 to The Telegraph from the "Common Sense Group" of Conservative Parliamentarians. The letter accused the National Trust of being "coloured by cultural Marxist dogma, colloquially known as the 'woke agenda'".

Mackinlay led the Net Zero Scrutiny Group, a group created in 2021 of about 20 Conservative MPs who argue against the Westminster consensus to reduce greenhouse gas emissions to net zero by 2050 regardless of the economic cost. They have argued for fracking in the United Kingdom to be resumed and cast doubt on the viability and desirability of a planned phase-out of fossil fuel vehicles.

Mackinlay initially planned to contest the new seat of East Thanet, which contained the majority of his former seat of South Thanet, at the 2024 general election, but announced on 24 May 2024 that he would not do so, owing to his ongoing rehabilitation and recovery from a severe case of sepsis that required the amputation of his lower arms and legs.

== Later career ==
After standing down from the House of Commons, Mackinlay was nominated for a life peerage in the 2024 Dissolution Honours. Created Baron Mackinlay of Richborough, of Rochester in the County of Kent, on 23 August 2024, he was introduced to the House of Lords on 17 October. He pledged to use his position to campaign for greater awareness of sepsis and to improve the quality of prosthetics offered to amputees.

In March 2025, Mackinlay was appointed as Director of the Global Warming Policy Foundation, succeeding Benny Peiser.

== Electoral spending criminal investigation following the 2015 general election ==
In 2016–17, the 2015 general election party spending investigation revealed that the Conservative Party had spent thousands of pounds centrally on campaign buses to transport activists, and hotel accommodation for the activists, who went to campaign in marginal constituencies, including South Thanet. The expenditure on the buses was declared by the Conservative Party on its national declaration of "Campaign Spending", but in some cases the hotel accommodation was not declared as election spending. In addition, there was controversy about whether the expenditure, both on the buses and the accommodation, should have been declared on the declarations of expenditure for the constituency made by each candidate's election agent. Kent Police began an investigation into the spending returns of Mackinlay following the Channel 4 report.

In a court case on 1 June 2016, brought by Mackinlay and his election agent Nathan Gray, District Judge Barron granted more time for investigation saying "In this case, the allegations are far-reaching and the consequences of a conviction would be of a local and national significance with the potential for election results being declared void."

On 14 March 2017, it was reported that Mackinlay had been interviewed under caution by officers investigating the allegations. The day after, Channel 4 News published leaked emails, alleging that Theresa May's Political Secretary Stephen Parkinson, and Chris Brannigan, Director of Government Relations at the Cabinet Office, also took a key role in Mackinlay's campaign. On 18 April 2017, Kent police passed Mackinlay's file to the Crown Prosecution Service (CPS) to be considered for prosecution. The CPS decided on 2 June 2017 that it was in the public interest to authorise charges under the Representation of the People Act 1983 against three people: Mackinlay, his agent Nathan Gray, and a party activist, Marion Little. Appearing at Westminster Magistrates' Court on 4 July 2017, the three pleaded not guilty and were released on unconditional bail pending an appearance at Southwark Crown Court on 1 August 2017.

Later in August 2017, a trial date of 14 May 2018 was set for Mackinlay on charges relating to his 2015 general election expenses, alongside Little and Gray. The trial eventually started on 15 October 2018. Gray was acquitted in December 2018, and Mackinlay was acquitted on 9 January 2019. Little was convicted of two counts relating to falsifying election expenses and was given a nine-month suspended prison sentence and fined £5,000; the court concluded that Mackinlay and Gray had signed documents falsified by Little "in good faith, not knowing what she had done".

== Public service ==
Mackinlay was appointed a justice of the peace on the North Kent bench in 2006. A freeman of the City of London, he served as a trustee of three Kent charities: Chatham Historic Dockyard Trust, Foord Almshouses in Rochester, and Medway Sculpture Trust.

== Personal life ==
Mackinlay married Katalin "Kati" Madi, a Hungarian pharmacist, in 2011. They have a daughter.

In September 2023, Mackinlay developed a very rapidly progressing case of sepsis and was placed in an induced coma for 16 days. He underwent a quadruple amputation of his limbs on 1 December at St Thomas' Hospital in London. Mackinlay was fitted with prosthetic limbs and expressed a desire to be known as the first "bionic MP". He received a rare standing ovation when he returned to the House of Commons on 22 May 2024.

== Notes ==
Party political offices
Preceded by Alan Sked	Leader of the UK Independence Party; Acting; 1997	Succeeded by Michael Holmes
New office	Deputy Leader of the UK Independence Party; 1997–2000	Succeeded by Graham Booth
Parliament of the United Kingdom
Preceded by Laura Sandys	Member of Parliament for South Thanet; 2015–2024	Succeeded by Polly Billington (East Thanet)
