= Graham Booth =

British politician (1940–2011)

Deputy Leader of the UK Independence Party
- In office 22 January 2000 – 5 October 2002
- Preceded by: Craig Mackinlay
- Succeeded by: Mike Nattrass

Member of the European Parliament for South West England
- In office 15 December 2002 – 1 October 2008
- Preceded by: Michael Holmes
- Succeeded by: Trevor Colman

Personal details
- Born: 29 March 1940 Paignton, Devon, United Kingdom
- Died: 14 December 2011 (aged 71)
- Party: UK Independence Party

Graham Harry Booth (29 March 1940 – 14 December 2011) was a British UK Independence Party (UKIP) politician who served as a Member of the European Parliament (MEP) for South West England from 2002 to 2008.

Booth was born in Paignton, Devon and educated at Torquay Boys' Grammar School. Before he entered politics, he was a businessman in the building and tourism trades. In the 1999 European Parliament elections, Booth was the number two candidate on the UKIP list for South West England. Consequently, he became an MEP in 2002 as the replacement for Michael Holmes, former party leader, when Holmes resigned from the European Parliament. Booth was re-elected in 2004 with a greatly increased vote. In the 2005 General Election he contested the Torbay constituency in Devon, and gained 7.9% of the vote.

UKIP MEPs frequently claim that the European Parliament is a powerless talking shop, with real lawmaking power resting with the European Commission. However, Graham Booth is credited with having helped save the Isles of Scilly helicopter shuttle service in his constituency by means of an astute parliamentary speech in 2003. The service, which is crucial to life on the islands, had been threatened with closure by a heavy-handed interpretation of a new EU directive aimed at larger airlines. Following Booth's speech, an alliance between UKIP and the UK Labour Party MEPs persuaded the EU Transport Commissioner to amend the directive, allowing the service (and similar 'social carriers' across Europe) to continue in business.

Booth retired from his role as a UKIP MEP on 1 October 2008 and was replaced by the next candidate on the list, Trevor Colman. He continued to be a keen activist in and around the bay until his death in December 2011.

Party political offices
Preceded by Craig Mackinlay	Deputy Leader of the UK Independence Party; 2000–2002	Succeeded by Mike Nattrass
