= Julia Reid =

Brexit Party politician (born 1952)

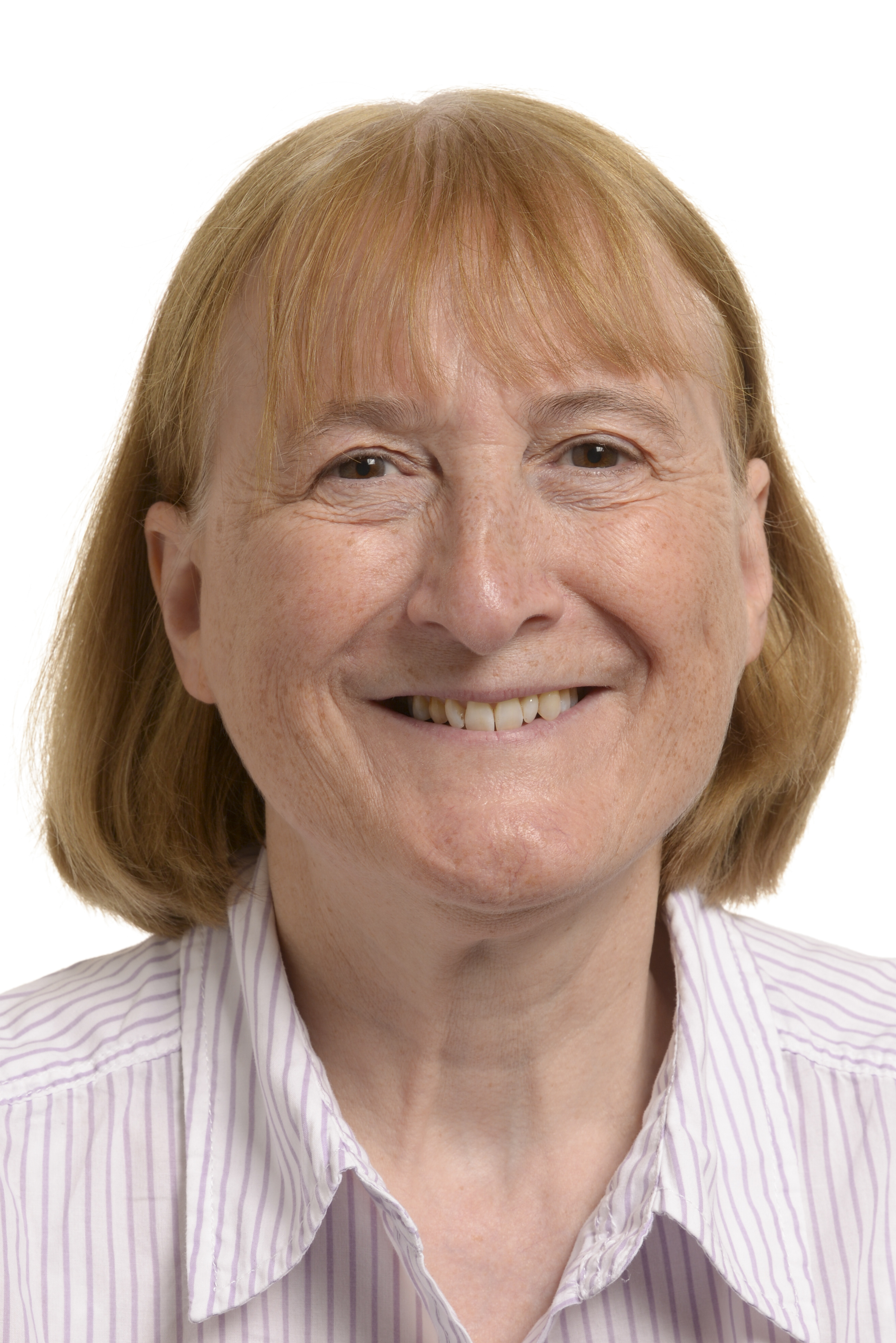

UKIP Spokesperson for Health and Social Care
- In office 11 June 2017 – 22 January 2018
- Leader: Steve Crowther (Acting); Henry Bolton
- Preceded by: Suzanne Evans
- Succeeded by: Vacant

UKIP Spokesperson for the Environment
- In office 29 November 2016 – 22 January 2017
- Leader: Paul Nuttall; Steve Crowther (Acting); Henry Bolton
- Preceded by: Office established
- Succeeded by: Stuart Agnew

UKIP Spokesperson for Science
- In office 24 July 2014 – 29 November 2016
- Leader: Nigel Farage; Diane James; Nigel Farage (Acting)

Member of the European Parliament for South West England
- In office 1 July 2014 – 1 July 2019
- Preceded by: Trevor Colman
- Succeeded by: Ann Widdecombe

Personal details
- Born: Julia Rudman; 16 July 1952 (age 74) Brockley, Lewisham, London, England, UK
- Party: Reform UK (2019–present)
- Other political affiliations: SDP (1981–1988) 'Continuing' SDP (1988–1990); UKIP (1993–2018); Independent (2018–2019)
- Spouse: Ken Reid (m. 1987)
- Education: University of Bath
- Website: juliareid.co.uk

Julia Reid (née Rudman; born 16 July 1952) is a British politician and a former Member of the European Parliament (MEP) for the South West England region.

== Education and early career ==
She was educated at Bentley Grammar School, Calne, and the University of Bath, where she graduated with a degree in biochemistry, later obtaining a PhD in pharmacology. She worked as a diabetes laboratory researcher at Bath's Royal United Hospital until being made redundant in 2009.

== Political career ==
Reid joined the Social Democratic Party (SDP) during its inaugural year, 1981, and stayed with the party until its merger with the Liberals in 1988. Reid opposed the pro-EEC stance of the new Liberal Democrats and instead joined the continuing SDP, which turned out to be short-lived.

In 1993, Reid joined the newly founded UK Independence Party (UKIP). She was fourth on the South West region party list for the 2009 European election. In 2010, she contested the new seat of Chippenham in the general election, finishing fourth with 1,783 votes (3.4%). In 2011, she became a research assistant for UKIP MEP Trevor Colman. She was elected in 2014 for UKIP in the South West England region of the European Parliament. She contested Chippenham again in 2015, coming third.

Reid left UKIP in December 2018 in protest at the party's move to the right and, as the "final straw", the appointment of Tommy Robinson as an advisor. She joined the new Brexit Party in February 2019.

In local government, Reid was elected to Calne town council in 2013.
