= Kingsbury Green Academy =

Location
- White Horse Way; Calne, Wiltshire, SN11 8YH; England; 51°25′43″N 2°00′10″W

Information
- Type: Academy
- Motto: Achieving Excellence Together
- Established: 1974
- Founder: Wiltshire County Council
- Department for Education URN: 137650 Tables
- Ofsted: Reports
- Head teacher: Nicola Bull
- Gender: Mixed
- Age: 11 to 18
- Enrolment: 1,065 pupils
- Colours: Dark blue, light blue and grey
- Website: kingsburygreenacademy.com

Kingsbury Green Academy is a mixed secondary school and sixth form in Calne, Wiltshire, England for pupils aged 11 to 18. The school's present site to the south of the town was the last home of the former Bentley Grammar School, from 1957 to 1974, and the present school was called The John Bentley School when it was created as a new comprehensive in 1974. The school's name was changed to Kingsbury Green Academy in 2019, after it joined the Ascend Learning Trust (known at the time of joining as the Royal Wootton Bassett Academy Trust).

== History ==
The school was formed in 1974 when the Bentley Grammar School and the Fynemore Secondary Modern School were closed. It took over the sites of both schools and used them until 1998, when the Fynemore School site in Silver Street was given up and more buildings were added to the Wessington site, and existing ones were improved. It also took over nearly all of the pupils and most of the staff of the former schools.

The oldest Calne school was founded in 1557 by Walter Fynemore of Whetham (just outside Calne). He gave an annuity of 40 shillings (£2) towards the foundation of a free school to be established within the Borough of Calne. The money devised was to be used for the education and bringing up of ten children of the poor. Various other bequests were made during the 16th century and the school's revenue was further augmented by a grant from borough funds.

The school did not possess a building until 1830; lessons had been held in a disused malthouse until then. Subscriptions from residents and a few wealthy landowners were collected and a site on The Green in Calne town was given by the Marquis of Lansdowne. The school became the Boys' National School. In 1856 another site on The Green was occupied by the Girls' National School, built at the expense of a Mrs Wetherall of Patford Street, Calne.

The second-oldest school in Calne sanctioned by the Charity Commissioners was the Bentley Grammar School founded in 1663 by the trustees under the will of John Bentley of Richmond, Surrey. The newly erected school (with a schoolmaster's house) remained until 1833. In 1894 the Charity Commissioners reorganised the school and modernised it. In 1901 it was combined with the Technical Institute which had been established in 1894.

Both schools continued to expand into the 20th century. Bentley Grammar School moved onto the site of the present school in 1957 and the Elementary School (later to be the Fynamore Secondary Modern School) was built at the Wenhill Lane site (now a housing estate) in 1930.

In 1974, the two school sites became the home of the new John Bentley Comprehensive School and it remained on a split site (called North Wing and South Wing) until 1998, when the North Wing site was sold and the South or Wessington site was developed.

The school's Language College status was formally recognised by an official opening by the Queen in 2001, by which time its name was The John Bentley School. The school also gained training school status in 2001. In recognition of its status as "a good school with many outstanding features" (Ofsted), the school was invited to apply for academy status in 2010.

The school joined Royal Wootton Bassett Academy Trust in April 2019 (alongside Royal Wootton Bassett Academy and Lawn Manor Academy, Swindon) and was renamed Kingsbury Green Academy in September 2019. Its name reflects the siting of National Schools in the 19th century at The Green in the Kingsbury area of the town.

== Campus and facilities ==
Set in the Wiltshire countryside, the school has 13 science labs, a design and technology complex with a focus on resistant materials, digital media, computer-aided design, textiles, food, graphics and ICT. It has three fully equipped drama studios and three purpose-built music rooms with practice rooms for instrument tuition. There are data projectors and interactive whiteboards in all departments. It has a sports hall, gymnasium and 33 acres of sports fields, as well as the use of the White Horse Leisure Centre, which has seven tennis courts. There are art and design studios for painting, drawing, fabric printing, ceramics, computer-aided design and modelling, together with a photography dark room and processing facilities. There is a cafeteria with an outdoor covered eating area, gardens, an on-site nursery (babies to pre-school) and a purpose-built Sixth Form Centre.

== Ofsted and academic performance ==
At the most recent Ofsted inspection, in June 2022, the school was graded as 'good' in all categories. The previous grading in March 2018 had been 'requires improvement'.

== Notable alumni ==
- Liam Dawson, cricketer
- Bobby Long, singer-songwriter
