= Specificity (symbiosis) =

Taxonomic range with which an organism associates in a symbiosis

Specificity in symbiosis refers to the taxonomic range with which an organism associates in a symbiosis. In a symbiosis between a larger organism such as a plant or an animal (called host) and a microorganism (called symbiont) specificity can be looked at both from the perspective of the host i.e. how many different species of symbionts does the host associate with (symbiont specificity), as well as from the perspective of the symbiont i.e. how many different host species can a symbiont associate with (host specificity).

There are two major approaches to determine specificity, the field based (ecological) approach and the physiological (experimental) approach. In the field based approach specificity is assessed by determining the natural range of hosts or symbionts an organism associates with. In the physiological approach combinations of potential symbiotic partners are brought together artificially in the laboratory and the successful establishment of symbiosis is assessed. For example, while in the laboratory the midgut crypts of the bean bug Riptortus pedestris can be colonized by a large diversity of bacterial species in nature it only occurs with one specific Burkholderia species.
