= Fluent calculus =

Formalism for expressing dynamical domains in first-order logic

The fluent calculus is a formalism for expressing dynamical domains in first-order logic. It is a variant of the situation calculus. A binary function symbol $\circ$ is used to concatenate the terms that represent facts that hold in a situation. For example, that the box is on the table in the situation $s$ is represented by the formula $\exists t . s = on(box,table) \circ t$. The frame problem is solved by asserting that the situation after the execution of an action is identical to the one before but for the conditions changed by the action. For example, the action of moving the box from the table to the floor is formalized as:

$$State(Do(move(box,table,floor), s)) \circ on(box,table) = State(s) \circ on(box,floor)$$

This formula states that the state after the move added the term $on(box,floor)$ and removed the term $on(box,table)$. Axioms specifying that $\circ$ is commutative and non-idempotent are necessary for such axioms to work.

== See also ==
- Fluent (artificial intelligence)
- Frame problem
- Situation calculus
- Event calculus
