= FSU Young Scholars Program =

Florida State University program

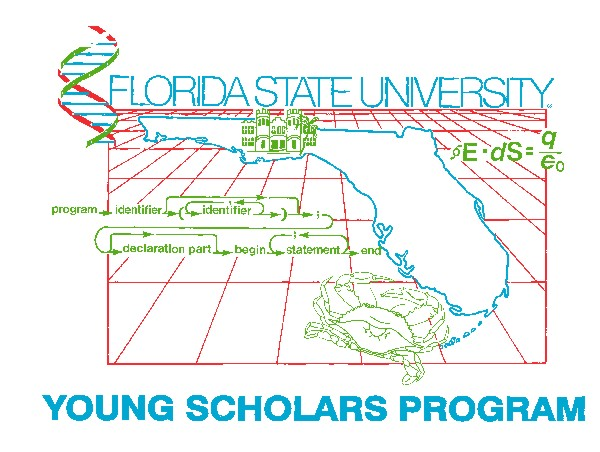
- Location: Tallahassee, Florida United States
- Co-directors: Barbara Shoplock, Hannah Hiester
- Website: http://ysp.osta.fsu.edu/

FSU Young Scholars Program (YSP) is a six-week residential science and mathematics summer program for 40 high school students from Florida, USA, with significant potential for careers in the fields of science, technology, engineering and mathematics. The program was developed in 1983 and is currently administered by the Office of Science Teaching Activities in the College of Arts and Sciences at Florida State University (FSU).

== Academic program ==
Each young scholar attends three courses in the fields of mathematics, science and computer programming. The courses are designed specifically for this program — they are neither high school nor college courses.

== Research ==
Each student who attends YSP is assigned an independent research project (IRP) based on his or her interests. Students join the research teams of FSU professors, participating in scientific research for two days each week. The fields of study available include robotics, molecular biology, chemistry, geology, physics and zoology. At the conclusion of the program, students present their projects in an academic conference, documenting their findings and explaining their projects to both students and faculty.

== Selection process ==
YSP admits students who have completed the eleventh grade in a Florida public or private high school. A few exceptionally qualified and mature tenth graders have been selected in past years, though this is quite rare.

All applicants must have completed pre-calculus and maintain at least a 3.0 unweighted GPA to be considered for acceptance. Additionally, students must have scored at the 90th percentile or better in science or mathematics on a nationally standardized exam, such as the SAT, PSAT, ACT or PLAN. Students are required to submit an application package, including high school transcripts and a letter of recommendation.

Selection is extremely competitive, as there are typically over 200 highly qualified applicants competing for only 40 positions. The majority of past participants graduated in the top ten of their respective high school classes, with over 25% of students entering their senior year ranked first in their class. The average PSAT score of past young scholars was in the 97th percentile in mathematics and the 94th percentile in critical reading nationally.
