= Rational consequence relation =

In logic, a rational consequence relation is a non-monotonic consequence relation satisfying certain properties listed below.

A rational consequence relation is a logical framework that refines traditional deductive reasoning to better model real-world scenarios. It incorporates rules like reflexivity, left logical equivalence, right-hand weakening, cautious monotony, disjunction on the left-hand side, logical and on the right-hand side, and rational monotony. These rules enable the relation to handle everyday situations more effectively by allowing for non-monotonic reasoning, where conclusions can be drawn based on usual rather than absolute implications. This approach is particularly useful in cases where adding more information can change the outcome, providing a more nuanced understanding than monotone consequence relations.

== Properties ==
A rational consequence relation $\vdash$ satisfies:

REF
Reflexivity $\theta \vdash \theta$

and the so-called Gabbay–Makinson rules:

LLE
Left logical equivalence $\frac{\theta \vdash \psi \quad\quad \theta \equiv \phi}{\phi \vdash \psi}$
RWE
Right-hand weakening $\frac{\theta \vdash \phi \quad\quad \phi \models \psi}{\theta \vdash \psi}$
CMO
Cautious monotonicity $\frac{\theta \vdash \phi \quad\quad \theta \vdash \psi}{\theta \wedge \psi \vdash \phi}$
DIS
Logical or (i.e. disjunction) on left hand side $\frac{\theta \vdash \psi \quad\quad \phi \vdash \psi}{\theta \vee \phi \vdash \psi}$
AND
Logical and on right hand side $\frac{\theta \vdash \phi \quad\quad \theta \vdash \psi}{\theta \vdash \phi \wedge \psi}$
RMO
Rational monotonicity $\frac{\phi \not\vdash \neg\theta \quad\quad \phi \vdash \psi}{\phi \wedge \theta \vdash \psi}$

== Uses ==
The rational consequence relation is non-monotonic, and the relation $\theta \vdash \phi$ is intended to carry the meaning theta usually implies phi or phi usually follows from theta. In this sense it is more useful for modeling some everyday situations than a monotone consequence relation because the latter relation models facts in a more strict boolean fashion—something either follows under all circumstances or it does not.

=== Example: cake ===
The statement "If a cake contains sugar then it tastes good" implies under a monotone consequence relation the statement "If a cake contains sugar and soap then it tastes good." Clearly this doesn't match our own understanding of cakes. By asserting "If a cake contains sugar then it usually tastes good" a rational consequence relation allows for a more realistic model of the real world, and certainly it does not automatically follow that "If a cake contains sugar and soap then it usually tastes good."

Note that if we also have the information "If a cake contains sugar then it usually contains butter" then we may legally conclude (under CMO) that "If a cake contains sugar and butter then it usually tastes good.". Equally in the absence of a statement such as "If a cake contains sugar then usually it contains no soap" then we may legally conclude from RMO that "If the cake contains sugar and soap then it usually tastes good."

If this latter conclusion seems ridiculous to you then it is likely that you are subconsciously asserting your own preconceived knowledge about cakes when evaluating the validity of the statement. That is, from your experience you know that cakes that contain soap are likely to taste bad so you add to the system your own knowledge such as "Cakes that contain sugar do not usually contain soap.", even though this knowledge is absent from it. If the conclusion seems silly to you then you might consider replacing the word soap with the word eggs to see if it changes your feelings.

=== Example: drugs ===
Consider the sentences:

- Young people are usually happy
- Drug abusers are usually not happy
- Drug abusers are usually young

We may consider it reasonable to conclude:

- Young drug abusers are usually not happy

This would not be a valid conclusion under a monotonic deduction system (omitting of course the word 'usually'), since the third sentence would contradict the first two. In contrast the conclusion follows immediately using the Gabbay–Makinson rules: applying the rule CMO to the last two sentences yields the result.

== Consequences ==
The following consequences follow from the above rules:

MP
Modus ponens $\frac{\theta \vdash \phi \quad\quad \theta \vdash \left( \phi \rightarrow \psi \right)}{\theta \vdash \psi}$
MP is proved via the rules AND and RWE.

CON
Conditionalisation $\frac{\theta \wedge \phi \vdash \psi}{\theta \vdash \left(\phi \rightarrow \psi \right)}$

CC
Cautious cut $\frac{\theta \vdash \phi \quad\quad \theta \wedge \phi \vdash \psi}{\theta \vdash \psi}$
The notion of cautious cut simply encapsulates the operation of conditionalisation, followed by MP. It may seem redundant in this sense, but it is often used in proofs so it is useful to have a name for it to act as a shortcut.

SCL
Supraclassity $\frac{\theta \models \phi}{\theta \vdash \phi}$
SCL is proved trivially via REF and RWE.

== Rational consequence relations via atom preferences ==
Let $L = \{p_1, \ldots , p_n\}$ be a finite language. An atom is a formula of the form $\bigwedge_{i=1}^n p^\epsilon_i$ (where $p^1 = p$ and $p^{-1} = \neg p$). Notice that there is a unique valuation which makes any given atom true (and conversely each valuation satisfies precisely one atom). Thus an atom can be used to represent a preference about what we believe ought to be true.

Let $At^L$ be the set of all atoms in L. For $\theta \in$ SL, define $S_\theta = \{\alpha \in At^L | \alpha \models^{SC} \theta \}$.

Let $\vec{s} = s_1, \ldots , s_m$ be a sequence of subsets of $At^L$. For $\theta$, $\phi$ in SL, let the relation $\vdash_\vec{s}$ be such that $\theta \vdash_{\vec{s}} \phi$ if one of the following holds:

1. $S_\theta \cap s_i = \emptyset$ for each $1 \leq i \leq m$
2. $S_\theta \cap s_i \neq \emptyset$ for some $1 \leq i \leq m$ and for the least such i, $S_\theta \cap s_i \subseteq S_\phi$.

Then the relation $\vdash_\vec{s}$ is a rational consequence relation. This may easily be verified by checking directly that it satisfies the GM-conditions.

The idea behind the sequence of atom sets is that the earlier sets account for the most likely situations such as "young people are usually law abiding" whereas the later sets account for the less likely situations such as "young joyriders are usually not law abiding".

=== Notes ===
1. By the definition of the relation $\vdash_\vec{s}$, the relation is unchanged if we replace $s_2$ with $s_2 \setminus s_1$, $s_3$ with $s_3 \setminus s_2 \setminus s_1$ ... and $s_m$ with $s_m \setminus \bigcup_{i=1}^{m-1} s_i$. In this way we make each $s_i$ disjoint. Conversely it makes no difference to the rational consequence relation $\vdash_\vec{s}$ if we add to subsequent $s_i$ atoms from any of the preceding $s_i$.

== The representation theorem ==
It can be proven that any rational consequence relation on a finite language is representable via a sequence of atom preferences above. That is, for any such rational consequence relation $\vdash$ there is a sequence $\vec{s} = s_1, \ldots , s_m$ of subsets of $At^L$ such that the associated rational consequence relation $\vdash_\vec{s}$ is the same relation: ${\vdash_\vec{s}} = {\vdash}$

=== Notes ===
1. By the above property of $\vdash_\vec{s}$, the representation of a rational consequence relation $\vdash$ need not be unique—if the $s_i$ are not disjoint then they can be made so without changing the rational consequence relation and conversely if they are disjoint then each subsequent set can contain any of the atoms of the previous sets without changing the rational consequence relation.
