= Reification (statistics) =

In statistics, reification is the use of an idealized model of a statistical process. The model is then used to make inferences connecting model results, which imperfectly represent the actual process, with experimental observations.

Also, a process whereby model-derived quantities such as principal components, factors and latent variables are identified, named and treated as if they were directly measurable quantities.
