= Reification (knowledge representation) =

Using a statement as an object of another

Reification in knowledge representation is the process of turning a predicate or statement into an addressable object. Reification allows the representation of assertions so that they can be referred to or qualified by other assertions, i.e., meta-knowledge.

The message "John is six feet tall" is an assertion involving truth that commits the speaker to its factuality, whereas the reified statement "Mary reports that John is six feet tall" defers such commitment to Mary. In this way, the statements can be incompatible without creating contradictions in reasoning. For example, the statements "John is six feet tall" and "John is five feet tall" are mutually exclusive (and thus incompatible), but the statements "Mary reports that John is six feet tall" and "Paul reports that John is five feet tall" are not incompatible, as they are both governed by a conclusive rationale that either Mary or Paul is (or both are), in fact, incorrect.

In linguistics, reporting, telling, and saying are recognized as verbal processes that project a wording (or locution). If a person says that "Paul told x" and "Mary told y", this person stated only that the telling took place. In this case, the person who made these two statements did not represent a person inconsistently. In addition, if two people are talking to each other, let's say Paul and Mary, and Paul tells Mary "John is five feet tall" and Mary rejects Paul's statement by saying "No, he is actually six feet tall", the socially constructed model of John does not become inconsistent. The reason for that is that statements are to be understood as an attempt to convince the addressee of something (Austin's How to do things with words), alternatively as a request to add some attribute to the model of Paul. The response to a statement can be an acknowledgement, in which case the model is changed, or it can be a statement rejection, in which case the model does not get changed. Finally, the example above for which John is said to be "five feet tall" or "six feet tall" is only incompatible because John can only be a single number of feet tall. If the attribute were a possession as in "he has a dog" or "he also has a cat", a model inconsistency would not happen. In other words, the issue of model inconsistency has to do with our model of the domain element (John) and not with the ascription of different range elements (measurements such as "five feet tall" or "six feet tall").

== See also ==
- Ontology
- Reification (computer science)
- Reification (fallacy)
- Reification (linguistics)
- RDF Statement reification and context
