= Strategic Computing Initiative =

US government initiative 1983–1993

The United States government's Strategic Computing Initiative funded research into advanced computer hardware and artificial intelligence from 1983 to 1993. The initiative was designed to support various projects that were required to develop machine intelligence in a prescribed ten-year time frame, from chip design and manufacture, computer architecture to artificial intelligence software. The Department of Defense spent a total of $1 billion on the project.

The inspiration for the program was Japan's fifth generation computer project, an enormous initiative that set aside billions for research into computing and artificial intelligence. As with Sputnik in 1957, the American government saw the Japanese project as a challenge to its technological dominance. The British government also funded a program of their own around the same time, known as Alvey, and a consortium of U.S. companies funded another similar project, the Microelectronics and Computer Technology Corporation.

The goal of SCI, and other contemporary projects, was nothing less than full machine intelligence. "The machine envisioned by SC", according to Alex Roland and Philip Shiman, "would run ten billion instructions per second to see, hear, speak, and think like a human. The degree of integration required would rival that achieved by the human brain, the most complex instrument known to man."

The initiative was conceived as an integrated program, similar to the Apollo moon program, where different subsystems would be created by various companies and academic projects and eventually brought together into a single integrated system. Roland and Shiman wrote that "While most research programs entail tactics or strategy, SC boasted grand strategy, a master plan for an entire campaign."

The project was funded by the Defense Advanced Research Projects Agency and directed by the Information Processing Technology Office (IPTO). By 1985 it had spent $100 million, and 92 projects were underway at 60 institutions: half in industry, half in universities and government labs. Robert Kahn, who directed IPTO in those years, provided the project with its early leadership and inspiration. Clint Kelly managed the SC Initiative for three years and developed many of the specific application programs for DARPA, such as the Autonomous Land Vehicle.

By the late 1980s, it was clear that the project would fall short of realizing the hoped-for levels of machine intelligence. Program insiders pointed to issues with integration, organization, and communication. When Jack Schwarz ascended to the leadership of IPTO in 1987, he cut funding to artificial intelligence research (the software component) "deeply and brutally", "eviscerating" the program (wrote Pamela McCorduck). Schwarz felt that DARPA should focus its funding only on those technologies which showed the most promise. In his words, DARPA should "surf", rather than "dog paddle", and he felt strongly AI was not "the next wave".

The project was superseded in the 1990s by the Accelerated Strategic Computing Initiative and then by the Advanced Simulation and Computing Program. These later programs did not include artificial general intelligence as a goal, but instead focused on supercomputing for large scale simulation, such as atomic bomb simulations. The Strategic Computing Initiative of the 1980s is distinct from the 2015 National Strategic Computing Initiative—the two are unrelated.

== Results ==
Although the program failed to meet its goal of high-level machine intelligence, it did meet some of its specific technical objectives, for example those of autonomous land navigation. The Autonomous Land Vehicle program and its sister Navlab project at Carnegie Mellon University, in particular, laid the scientific and technical foundation for many of the driverless vehicle programs that came after it, such as the Demo II and III programs (ALV being Demo I), Perceptor, and the DARPA Grand Challenge. The use of video cameras plus laser scanners and inertial navigation units pioneered by the SCI ALV program form the basis of almost all commercial driverless car developments today. It also helped to advance the state of the art of computer hardware to a considerable degree.

On the software side, the initiative funded development of the Dynamic Analysis and Replanning Tool (DART), a program that handled logistics using artificial intelligence techniques. This was a huge success, saving the Department of Defense billions during Desert Storm. Introduced in 1991, DART had by 1995 offset the monetary equivalent of all funds DARPA had channeled into AI research for the previous 30 years combined.

== See also ==
- AI winter § Cutbacks at the Strategic Computing Initiative
- Advanced Simulation and Computing Program
- History of artificial intelligence
