= JADE (planning system) =

U.S. military system used for planning

The Joint Assistant for Development and Execution (abbr. JADE) is a U.S. military system used for planning the deployment of military forces in crisis situations.

The U.S. military developed this automated planning software system in order to expedite the creation of the detailed planning needed to deploy military forces for a military operation. JADE uses Artificial Intelligence (AI) technology combining user input, a knowledge base of stored plans, and suggestions by the system to provide the ability to develop large-scale and complex plans in minimal time.

== History ==
In 1999, the operational tool used for managing force deployment planning in the U.S. military was the Joint Operation Planning and Execution System (JOPES). The JADE tool for rapid crisis action planning had been developed by BBN Technologies under a contract to DARPA within the ARPA-Rome Planning Initiative, but was available only in a prototype environment. In subsequent years, JADE was successfully demonstrated and then integrated into the Global Command and Control System (GCCS) and the Adaptive Course of Action (ACOA) environment while meeting the requirements of the Defense Information Infrastructure Common Operating Environment (DII-COE).

An official 2016 document approved for public release titled Human Systems Roadmap Review describes plans to create autonomous weapon systems that analyze social media and make decisions, including the use of lethal force, with minimal human involvement. This type of system is referred to as a Lethal Autonomous Weapon System (LAWS).

The name "JADE" comes from the jade green color seen on the island of Oahu in Hawaii where the U.S. Pacific Command (PACOM) is headquartered.

JFRG II will be replaced with JADE.

== Components ==
JADE integrates the technology of three software systems:

- ForMAT (Force Management and Analysis Tool) – a case-based reasoning (CBR) force deployment planning tool that uses past experience (past planned Force modules (FMs)); the tool was developed initially by The MITRE Corporation, and then developed further by BBN Technologies
- Prodigy-Analogy – a combined case-based reasoning and generative planner with a multi-strategy planning and learning architecture developed by Carnegie Mellon University
- PARKA – a highly indexed knowledge-based management system developed by the University of Maryland

== Features ==
JADE uses Artificial Intelligence (AI) technology with case-based and generative planning methods to provide the ability to develop large-scale and complex plans in minimal time. JADE is a knowledge-based system that uses highly structured information that takes advantage of data hierarchies. JADE uses dialog initiated both by the user and by the system. JADE is used to rapidly create Time Phased Force Deployment Data (TPFDD) to organize the deployment of combat-ready forces. Case-based planning methods (also known as the variant approach) use an existing plan for a similar mission and make the necessary modifications to the plan for the new mission. Generative planning methods build new plans from the mission goals and requirements by means of planning algorithms and the knowledge base.

JADE supports the retrieval and reuse of previous plan elements for use in the development of new plans by using a map-oriented drag and drop interface. Force modules (FMs) from previous plans (cases) can be dragged from the case library and dropped onto a geographic destination. To support plan adaption of previous plans or modifications resulting from changing mission requirements, constraint checking against the knowledge base and mission goals causes automatic reminders from the system to notify the user of changes and improvements that need to be made. JADE is a mixed-initiative system, using dialog initiated by both the user (user-initiative) and by the system (system-initiative).

The knowledge base supports the development of deployment plans for war and situations other than war. JADE is designed to inter-operate with the Adaptive Course of Action (ACOA) program, which provides a near real-time distributed collaborative environment that supports end-to-end joint planning by multiple command centers. The Time Phased Force Deployment Data (TPFDD) produced by JADE included an Operational Plan (OPLAN) which describes the mission and specifies where and when the forces involved in a mission are to be deployed. The TPFDD also specifies the combat forces and the combat service support required in order to support the mission, which includes transportation phasing, mode, and geographical locations.

== Time Phased Force Deployment Data (TPFDD) ==
"Time Phased Force Deployment Data" (TPFDD) is a U.S. Department of Defense (DOD) term. A TPFDD is the data base portion of an operation plan in the Joint Operation Planning and Execution System (JOPES); this system is part of the Global Command and Control System (GCCS). The TPFDD contains data on military units and forces regarding force data as scheduled over time, data for cargo and personnel that are not part of the units, and movement data for the operation plan.

Data regarding military units in the TPFDD include:

- Units that are already in-place
- Units deploying to support the operation plan, including a priority for the desired sequencing
- Routing and movement data associated with forces that are being deployed
- Estimates of non-unit-related cargo and personnel movements that occur concurrently with the deployment of forces
- Estimates of transportation requirements using common-user resources and resources assigned or attached

== See also ==
- Joint All-Domain Command and Control
  - Joint Warfighter Cloud Capability
  - AI and Data Acceleration initiative
- Automated planning and scheduling
- Battle command
- Battle command knowledge system
- Computer-aided process planning
- Dynamic Analysis and Replanning Tool (DART)
- FirstNet
- Future Attribute Screening Technology (FAST)
- Global Information Network Architecture (GINA)
- Goal-oriented inference
- Human Terrain System (HTS)
- NetOps
- Stingray phone tracker
- Palantir
