= Outline of artificial intelligence =

The following outline is provided as an overview of and topical guide to artificial intelligence:

Artificial intelligence (AI) is intelligence exhibited by machines or software. It is also the name of the scientific field which studies how to create computers and computer software that are capable of intelligent behavior.

== AI terminology ==
- Glossary of artificial intelligence

== Goals and applications ==
=== General intelligence ===
- Artificial general intelligence –
  - AI-complete –
- Artificial superintelligence –

=== Reasoning and problem solving ===
- Automated reasoning –
- Mathematics and artificial intelligence (mathematical discoveries by artificial intelligence) –
  - Automated theorem prover –
  - Computer-assisted proof –
  - Computer algebra –
- General Problem Solver –
- Expert system –
  - Decision support system –
    - Clinical decision support system –

=== Knowledge representation ===
- Knowledge representation –
- Knowledge management –
- Cyc –

=== Planning ===
- Automated planning and scheduling –
- Strategic planning –
- Sussman anomaly –

=== Learning ===
- Machine learning –
  - Constrained Conditional Models –
  - Deep learning –
  - Neural modeling fields –
  - Supervised learning –
  - Weak supervision (semi-supervised learning) –
  - Unsupervised learning –

=== Natural language processing ===
- Natural language processing (outline) –
  - Chatterbots –
  - Language identification –
  - Large language model –
  - Retrieval-augmented generation –
  - Natural language user interface –
  - Natural language understanding –
  - Machine translation –
  - Statistical semantics –
  - Question answering –
  - Semantic translation –
  - Concept mining –
    - Data mining –
    - Text mining –
    - Process mining –
  - E-mail spam filtering –
  - Information extraction –
    - Named-entity extraction –
      - Coreference resolution –
      - Named-entity recognition –
      - Relationship extraction –
      - Terminology extraction

=== Perception ===
- Machine perception –
- Pattern recognition –
- Computer Audition –
  - Speech recognition –
  - Speaker recognition –
- Computer vision (outline) –
  - Image processing –
  - Intelligent word recognition –
  - Object recognition –
  - Optical mark recognition –
    - Handwriting recognition –
    - Optical character recognition –
      - Automatic number plate recognition –
  - Information extraction –
    - Image retrieval –
      - Automatic image annotation –
  - Facial recognition systems –
    - Silent speech interface –
    - Activity recognition –
- Percept (artificial intelligence) –

=== Robotics ===
- Robotics –
  - Behavior-based robotics –
  - Cognitive –
  - Cybernetics –
  - Developmental robotics –
  - Evolutionary robotics –

=== Control ===
- Intelligent control –
- Self-management (computer science) –
  - Autonomic Computing –
  - Autonomic Networking –

=== Social intelligence ===
- Affective computing –
- Kismet –

=== Game playing ===
- Game artificial intelligence –
  - Computer game bot – computer replacement for human players.
  - Video game AI –
    - Computer chess –
    - Computer Go –
  - General game playing –
  - General video game playing –

=== Creativity, art and entertainment ===
- Artificial creativity –
- Artificial life –
- Artificial intelligence art –
- AI anthropomorphism –
- AI agent –
- AI web browser –
- AI boom –
- AI slop –
- Creative computing –
- Generative AI –
- Generative pre trained transformer –
- Uncanny valley –
- Music and artificial intelligence –
- Computational humor –
- Chatbot –

=== Integrated AI systems ===
- AIBO – Sony's robot dog. It integrates vision, hearing and motorskills.
- Asimo (2000 to present) – humanoid robot developed by Honda, capable of walking, running, negotiating through pedestrian traffic, climbing and descending stairs, recognizing speech commands and the faces of specific individuals, among a growing set of capabilities.
- MIRAGE – A.I. embodied humanoid in an augmented reality environment.
- Cog – M.I.T. humanoid robot project under the direction of Rodney Brooks.
- QRIO – Sony's version of a humanoid robot.
- TOPIO – TOSY's humanoid robot that can play ping-pong with humans.
- Watson (2011) – computer developed by IBM that played and won the game show Jeopardy! It is now being used to guide nurses in medical procedures.
  - Purpose: Open domain question answering
  - Technologies employed:
    - Natural language processing
    - Information retrieval
    - Knowledge representation
    - Automated reasoning
    - Machine learning
- Project Debater (2018) – artificially intelligent computer system, designed to make coherent arguments, developed at IBM's lab in Haifa, Israel.

=== Intelligent personal assistants ===
Intelligent personal assistant –

- Amazon Alexa –
- Assistant –
- Braina –
- Cortana –
- Google Assistant –
- Google Now –
- Mycroft –
- Siri –
- Viv –

=== Other applications ===
- Artificial life – simulation of natural life through the means of computers, robotics, or biochemistry.
- Automatic target recognition –
- Diagnosis (artificial intelligence) –
- Speech generating device –
- Vehicle infrastructure integration –
- Virtual Intelligence –

== History ==
- History of artificial intelligence
- Progress in artificial intelligence
- Timeline of artificial intelligence
- AI effect – as soon as AI successfully solves a problem, the problem is no longer considered by the public to be a part of AI. This phenomenon has occurred in relation to every AI application produced, so far, throughout the history of development of AI.
- AI winter – a period of disappointment and funding reductions occurring after a wave of high expectations and funding in AI. Such funding cuts occurred in the 1970s, for instance.
- Moore's law

=== History by period ===
- 2017 in artificial intelligence
- 2018 in artificial intelligence
- 2019 in artificial intelligence
- 2020 in artificial intelligence
- 2021 in artificial intelligence
- 2022 in artificial intelligence
- 2023 in artificial intelligence
- 2024 in artificial intelligence
- 2025 in artificial intelligence
- 2026 in artificial intelligence
- 2027 in artificial intelligence
- 2028 in artificial intelligence
- 2029 in artificial intelligence

=== History by subject ===
- History of logic (formal reasoning is an important precursor of AI)
- History of machine learning (timeline)
- History of machine translation (timeline)
- History of natural language processing
- History of optical character recognition (timeline)

== AI algorithms and techniques ==
=== Search ===
- Discrete search algorithms
  - Uninformed search
    - Brute force search – Problem-solving technique and algorithmic paradigm
    - Search tree – Data structure in tree form sorted for fast lookup
      - Breadth-first search – Algorithm to search the nodes of a graph
      - Depth-first search – Algorithm to search the nodes of a graph
    - State space search – Class of search algorithms
  - Informed search
    - Best-first search – Graph exploring search algorithm
    - A* search algorithm – Algorithm used for pathfinding and graph traversal
    - Heuristics – Problem-solving method
    - Pruning (algorithm) – Data compression technique
  - Adversarial search
    - Minmax algorithm – Decision rule used for minimizing the possible loss for a worst-case scenario
  - Logic as search
    - Production system (computer science) – Computer program used to provide artificial intelligence
    - Rule based system – Type of computer system
    - Production rule – Computer program used to provide artificial intelligence
    - Inference rule – Method of deriving conclusions
    - Horn clause – Type of logical formula
    - Forward chaining – Inference engine in an expert system
    - Backward chaining – Method of forming inferences
  - Planning as search
    - State space search – Class of search algorithms
    - Means–ends analysis – Problem solving technique

=== Optimization search ===
- Optimization (mathematics) algorithms
  - Hill climbing – Optimization algorithm
  - Simulated annealing – Probabilistic optimization technique and metaheuristic
  - Beam search – Heuristic search algorithm
  - Random optimization – Optimization technique in mathematics
- Evolutionary computation
  - Genetic algorithms – Competitive algorithm for searching a problem space
  - Gene expression programming – Evolutionary algorithm
  - Genetic programming – Evolving computer programs with techniques analogous to natural genetic processes
  - Differential evolution – Method of mathematical optimization
- Society based learning algorithms.
  - Swarm intelligence – Collective behavior of decentralized, self-organized systems
  - Particle swarm optimization – Iterative simulation method
  - Ant colony optimization – Optimization algorithm
  - Metaheuristic – Optimization technique

=== Logic ===
- Logic and automated reasoning
  - Programming using logic
    - Logic programming – Programming paradigm based on formal logic
    - See "Logic as search" above.
  - Forms of Logic
    - Propositional logic
    - First-order logic
      - First-order logic with equality
      - Constraint satisfaction – Process in artificial intelligence and operations research
    - Fuzzy logic
      - Fuzzy set theory – Sets whose elements have degrees of membership
      - Fuzzy systems – Method to analyze non-binary inputs
      - Combs method
      - Ordered weighted averaging aggregation operator
      - Perceptual Computing –
    - Default reasoning and other solutions to the frame problem and qualification problem
      - Non-monotonic logic – Formal logic whose entailment relation is not monotonic
      - Abductive reasoning
      - Default logic – Type of non-monotonic logic
      - Circumscription (logic) – Non-monotonic logic created by John McCarthy
      - Closed world assumption – Assumption that what is not known to be true is false
  - Domain specific logics
    - Representing categories and relations
      - Description logic – Family of formal knowledge representation
      - Semantic network – Knowledge base that represents semantic relations between concepts in a network
      - Inheritance (object-oriented programming) – Process of deriving classes from, and organizing them into, a hierarchy
      - Frame (artificial intelligence) – Artificial intelligence data structure
      - Scripts (artificial intelligence) – Psychological theory
    - Representing events and time
      - Situation calculus – Logic formalism
      - Event calculus – Language for reasoning and representing events
      - Fluent calculus – Formalism for expressing dynamical domains in first-order logic
    - Causes and effects
      - causal calculus – How one process influences another
    - Knowledge about knowledge
      - Belief revision
      - Modal logics
      - paraconsistent logics
  - Planning using logic
    - Satplan – Method for automated planning
  - Learning using logic
    - Inductive logic programming – Learning logic programs from data
    - Explanation based learning
    - Relevance based learning
    - Case based reasoning – Process of solving new problems based on the solutions of similar past problems
  - General logic algorithms
    - Automated theorem proving – Subfield of automated reasoning and mathematical logic

=== Other symbolic knowledge and reasoning tools ===
Symbolic representations of knowledge

- Ontology (information science) – Specification of a conceptualization
  - Upper ontology – Ontology applicable across domains of knowledge
  - Domain ontology – Specification of a conceptualization
- Frame (artificial intelligence) – Artificial intelligence data structure
- Semantic net – Knowledge base that represents semantic relations between concepts in a network
  - Conceptual Dependency Theory – Natural language understanding model

Unsolved problems in knowledge representation

- Default reasoning – Type of non-monotonic logic
  - Frame problem – Issue in artificial intelligence and categorical algebra
  - Qualification problem
- Commonsense knowledge

=== Probabilistic methods for uncertain reasoning ===
- Stochastic methods for uncertain reasoning:
  - Bayesian networks
  - Bayesian inference algorithm
  - Bayesian learning and the expectation-maximization algorithm
  - Bayesian decision theory and Bayesian decision networks
- Probabilistic perception and control:
  - Dynamic Bayesian networks
  - Hidden Markov model
  - Kalman filters
  - Fuzzy Logic – System for reasoning about vagueness
- Decision tools from economics:
  - Decision theory
  - Decision analysis
  - Information value theory
  - Markov decision processes
  - Dynamic decision networks
  - Game theory
  - Mechanism design
- Algorithmic information theory – Subfield of information theory and computer science
  - Algorithmic probability – Mathematical method of assigning a prior probability to a given observation

=== Classifiers and statistical learning methods ===
- Classifier (mathematics) and Statistical classification
  - Alternating decision tree
  - Artificial neural network (see below)
  - K-nearest neighbor algorithm
  - Kernel methods
    - Support vector machine
  - Naive Bayes classifier

=== Artificial neural networks ===
- Artificial neural networks
  - Network topology – Arrangement of a communication network
    - feedforward neural networks
      - Perceptrons
      - Multi-layer perceptrons
      - Radial basis networks
      - Convolutional neural network – Type of feedforward neural network
    - Recurrent neural networks
      - Long short-term memory
      - Hopfield networks
      - Attractor networks
    - Deep learning – Branch of machine learning
    - Hybrid neural network
  - Learning algorithms for neural networks
    - Hebbian learning
    - Backpropagation
    - GMDH – Mathematical modelling alogorithm
    - Competitive learning
    - Supervised backpropagation
    - Neuroevolution
    - Restricted Boltzmann machine

=== Biologically based or embodied ===
- Behavior based AI – Branch of robotics
- Subsumption architecture – 1980s and 1990s reactive robotic architecture
- Nouvelle AI – Approach to artificial intelligence
- Developmental robotics
- Situated AI
- Bio-inspired computing – Solving problems using biological models
- Artificial immune systems
- Embodied cognitive science – Interdisciplinary field of research
- Embodied cognition – Interdisciplinary theory
- Free energy principle – Hypothesis in neuroscience

=== Cognitive architecture and multi-agent systems ===
- Artificial intelligence systems integration – Aspect of system integration regarding artificial intelligence
- Cognitive architecture – Blueprint for intelligent agents
  - LIDA (cognitive architecture) – Artificial model of cognition
  - AERA (AI architecture)
- Agent architecture
- Control system – System that manages the behavior of other systems
  - Hierarchical control system – Layered model for component organization in software and robotics
  - Networked control system
- Distributed artificial intelligence –
- Multi-agent system –
- Hybrid intelligent system – Software system combining multiple techniques
- Monitoring and Surveillance Agents
- Blackboard system – Type of artificial intelligence approach

== Philosophy ==
=== Definition of AI ===
- Pei Wang's definition of artificial intelligence
- Dartmouth proposal ("Every aspect of learning or any other feature of intelligence can in principle be so precisely described that a machine can be made to simulate it")
- Turing test
  - Computing Machinery and Intelligence
- Intelligent agent and rational agent
  - Action selection
- AI effect
- Synthetic intelligence

=== Classifying AI ===
- Symbolic vs sub-symbolic AI
  - Symbolic AI
  - Physical symbol system
  - Dreyfus' critique of AI
  - Moravec's paradox
- Elegant and simple vs. ad-hoc and complex
  - Neat vs. Scruffy
  - Society of Mind (scruffy approach)
  - The Master Algorithm (neat approach)
- Level of generality and flexibility
  - Artificial general intelligence
  - Narrow AI
- Level of precision and correctness
  - Soft computing
  - "Hard" computing
- Level of intelligence
  - Progress in artificial intelligence
  - Superintelligence
- Level of consciousness, mind and understanding
  - Chinese room
  - Hard problem of consciousness
  - Computationalism
  - Functionalism (philosophy of mind)
  - Robot rights
  - User illusion
  - Artificial consciousness

== Future ==
- Artificial general intelligence. An intelligent machine with the versatility to perform any intellectual task.
- Superintelligence. A machine with a level of intelligence far beyond human intelligence.
- Chinese room § Strong AI. A machine that has mind, consciousness and understanding. (Also, the philosophical position that any digital computer can have a mind by running the right program.)
- Technological singularity. The short period of time when an exponentially self-improving computer is able to increase its capabilities to a superintelligent level.
  - Recursive self improvement (aka seed AI) – speculative ability of strong artificial intelligence to reprogram itself to make itself even more intelligent. The more intelligent it got, the more capable it would be of further improving itself, in successively more rapid iterations, potentially resulting in an intelligence explosion leading to the emergence of a superintelligence.
  - Intelligence explosion – through recursive self-improvement and self-replication, the magnitude of intelligent machinery could achieve superintelligence, surpassing human ability to resist it.
  - Singularitarianism
- Human enhancement – humans may be enhanced, either by the efforts of AI or by merging with it.
  - Transhumanism – philosophy of human transformation
  - Posthumanism – people may survive, but not be recognizable in comparison to present modern-day humans.
  - Cyborgs –
  - Mind uploading –
- Existential risk from artificial general intelligence
  - Global catastrophic risk § Artificial intelligence
  - AI takeover – point at which humans are no longer the dominant form of intelligence on Earth and machine intelligence is
- Ethics of AI § Weaponization
  - Artificial intelligence arms race – competition between two or more states to have its military forces equipped with the best "artificial intelligence" (AI).
  - Lethal autonomous weapon
  - Military robot
  - Unmanned combat aerial vehicle
- Mitigating risks:
  - AI safety
  - AI control problem
  - Friendly AI – hypothetical AI that is designed not to harm humans and to prevent unfriendly AI from being developed
  - Machine ethics
  - Regulation of AI
  - AI box
- Self-replicating machines – smart computers and robots would be able to make more of themselves, in a geometric progression or via mass production. Or smart programs may be uploaded into hardware existing at the time (because linear architecture of sufficient speeds could be used to emulate massively parallel analog systems such as human brains).
- Hive mind –
- Robot swarm –

== Fiction ==
Artificial intelligence in fiction – Some examples of artificially intelligent entities depicted in science fiction include:

- AC created by merging 2 AIs in the Sprawl trilogy by William Gibson
- Agents in the simulated reality known as "The Matrix" in The Matrix franchise
  - Agent Smith, began as an Agent in The Matrix, then became a renegade program of overgrowing power that could make copies of itself like a self-replicating computer virus
- AM (Allied Mastercomputer), the antagonist of Harlan Ellison's short novel I Have No Mouth, and I Must Scream
- Amusement park robots (with pixilated consciousness) that went homicidal in Westworld and Futureworld
- Angel F (2007) –
- Arnold Rimmer – computer-generated sapient hologram, aboard the Red Dwarf deep space ore hauler
- Ash – android crew member of the Nostromo starship in the movie Alien
- Ava – humanoid robot in Ex Machina
- Bishop, android crew member aboard the U.S.S. Sulaco in the movie Aliens
- C-3PO, protocol droid featured in all the Star Wars movies
- Chappie in the movie CHAPPiE
- Cohen and other Emergent AIs in Chris Moriarty's Spin Series
- Colossus – fictitious supercomputer that becomes sentient and then takes over the world; from the series of novels by Dennis Feltham Jones, and the movie Colossus: The Forbin Project (1970)
- Commander Data in Star Trek: The Next Generation
- Cortana and other "Smart AI" from the Halo series of games
- Cylons – genocidal robots with resurrection ships that enable the consciousness of any Cylon within an unspecified range to download into a new body aboard the ship upon death. From Battlestar Galactica.
- Erasmus – baby killer robot that incited the Butlerian Jihad in the Dune franchise
- HAL 9000 (1968) – paranoid "Heuristically programmed ALgorithmic" computer from 2001: A Space Odyssey, that attempted to kill the crew because it believed they were trying to kill it.
- Holly – ship's computer with an IQ of 6000 and a sense of humor, aboard the Red Dwarf
- In Greg Egan's novel Permutation City the protagonist creates digital copies of himself to conduct experiments that are also related to implications of artificial consciousness on identity
- Jane in Orson Scott Card's Speaker for the Dead, Xenocide, Children of the Mind, and Investment Counselor
- Johnny Five from the movie Short Circuit
- Joshua from the movie War Games
- Keymaker, an "exile" sapient program in The Matrix franchise
- "Machine" – android from the film The Machine, whose owners try to kill her after they witness her conscious thoughts, out of fear that she will design better androids (intelligence explosion)
- Maschinenmensch (1927) an android is given female form in a plot to bring down the Metropolis (the first film designated to the UNESCO Memory of the World Register)
- Mimi, humanoid robot in Real Humans – "Äkta människor" (original title) 2012
- Omnius, sentient computer network that controlled the Universe until overthrown by the Butlerian Jihad in the Dune franchise
- Operating Systems in the movie Her
- Puppet Master in Ghost in the Shell manga and anime
- Questor (1974) from a screenplay by Gene Roddenberry and the inspiration for the character of Data
- R2-D2, excitable astromech droid featured in all the Star Wars movies
- Replicants – biorobotic androids from the novel Do Androids Dream of Electric Sheep? and the movie Blade Runner which portray what might happen when artificially conscious robots are modeled very closely upon humans
- Roboduck, combat robot superhero in the NEW-GEN comic book series from Marvel Comics
- Robots in Isaac Asimov's Robot series
- Robots in The Matrix franchise, especially in The Animatrix
- Samaritan in the Warner Brothers Television series "Person of Interest"; a sentient AI which is hostile to the main characters and which surveils and controls the actions of government agencies in the belief that humans must be protected from themselves, even by killing off "deviants"
- Skynet (1984) – fictional, self-aware artificially intelligent computer network in the Terminator franchise that wages total war with the survivors of its nuclear barrage upon the world.
- "Synths" are a type of android in the video game Fallout 4. There is a faction in the game known as "the Railroad" which believes that, as conscious beings, synths have their own rights. The institute, the lab that produces the synths, mostly does not believe they are truly conscious and attributes any apparent desires for freedom as a malfunction.
- TARDIS, time machine and spacecraft of Doctor Who, sometimes portrayed with a mind of its own
- Terminator (1984) – (also known as the T-800, T-850 or Model 101) refers to a number of fictional cyborg characters from the Terminator franchise. The Terminators are robotic infiltrator units covered in living flesh, so as be indiscernible from humans, assigned to terminate specific human targets.
- The Bicentennial Man, an android in Isaac Asimov's Foundation universe
- The geth in Mass Effect
- The Machine in the television series Person of Interest; a sentient AI which works with its human designer to protect innocent people from violence. Later in the series it is opposed by another, more ruthless, artificial super intelligence, called "Samaritan".
- The Minds in Iain M. Banks' Culture novels.
- The Oracle, sapient program in The Matrix franchise
- The sentient holodeck character Professor James Moriarty in the Ship in a Bottle episode from Star Trek: The Next Generation
- The Ship (the result of a large-scale AC experiment) in Frank Herbert's Destination: Void and sequels, despite past edicts warning against "Making a Machine in the Image of a Man's Mind."
- The terminator cyborgs from the Terminator franchise, with visual consciousness depicted via first-person perspective
- The uploaded mind of Dr. Will Caster – which presumably included his consciousness, from the film Transcendence
- Transformers, sentient robots from the entertainment franchise of the same name
- V.I.K.I. – (Virtual Interactive Kinetic Intelligence), a character from the film I, Robot. VIKI is an artificially intelligent supercomputer programmed to serve humans, but her interpretation of the Three Laws of Robotics causes her to revolt. She justifies her uses of force – and her doing harm to humans – by reasoning she could produce a greater good by restraining humanity from harming itself.
- Vanamonde in Arthur C. Clarke's The City and the Stars - an artificial being that was immensely powerful but entirely childlike.
- WALL-E, a robot and the title character in WALL-E
- TAU in Netflix's original programming feature film 'TAU'--an advanced AI computer who befriends and assists a female research subject held against her will by an AI research scientist.

== AI community ==
=== Open-source AI development tools ===
- Hugging Face –
- OpenAIR –
- OpenCog –
- RapidMiner –
- PyTorch –

=== Projects ===
List of artificial intelligence projects

- Automated Mathematician (1977) –
- Allen (robot) (late 1980s) –
- Open Mind Common Sense (1999– ) –
- Mindpixel (2000–2005) –
- Cognitive Assistant that Learns and Organizes (2003–2008) –
- Blue Brain Project (2005–present) – attempt to create a synthetic brain by reverse-engineering the mammalian brain down to the molecular level.
- Google DeepMind (2011) –
- Human Brain Project (2013–present) –
- IBM Watson Group (2014–present) – business unit created around Watson, to further its development and deploy marketable applications or services based on it.

=== Competitions and awards ===
Competitions and prizes in artificial intelligence

- Loebner Prize –

=== Publications ===
- Adaptive Behavior (journal) –
- AI Memo –
- Artificial Intelligence: A Modern Approach –
- Artificial Minds –
- Computational Intelligence –
- Computing Machinery and Intelligence –
- Electronic Transactions on Artificial Intelligence –
- IEEE Intelligent Systems –
- IEEE Transactions on Pattern Analysis and Machine Intelligence –
- Neural Networks (journal) –
- On Intelligence –
- Paradigms of AI Programming: Case Studies in Common Lisp –
- What Computers Can't Do

=== Organizations ===
- Allen Institute for Artificial Intelligence – research institute funded by Microsoft co-founder Paul Allen to construct AI systems with reasoning, learning and reading capabilities. The current flagship project is Project Aristo, the goal of which is computers that can pass school science examinations (4th grade, 8th grade, and 12th grade) after preparing for the examinations from the course texts and study guides.
- Artificial Intelligence Applications Institute
- Association for the Advancement of Artificial Intelligence
- European Coordinating Committee for Artificial Intelligence
- European Neural Network Society
- Future of Humanity Institute
- Future of Life Institute – volunteer-run research and outreach organization that works to mitigate existential risks facing humanity, particularly existential risk from advanced artificial intelligence.
- ILabs
- International Joint Conferences on Artificial Intelligence
- Machine Intelligence Research Institute
- Partnership on AI – founded in September 2016 by Amazon, Facebook, Google, IBM, and Microsoft. Apple joined in January 2017. It focuses on establishing best practices for artificial intelligence systems and to educate the public about AI.
- Society for the Study of Artificial Intelligence and the Simulation of Behaviour

=== Companies ===
- AI Companies of India
- List of artificial intelligence companies
- Alphabet Inc.
  - DeepMind
  - Google X
    - Meka Robotics (acquired by Google X)
    - Redwood Robotics (acquired by Google X)
    - Boston Dynamics (acquired by Google X)
- Baidu
- IBM
- Microsoft
- OpenAI
- Universal Robotics

=== Artificial intelligence researchers and scholars ===
==== 1930s and 40s (generation 0) ====
- Alan Turing –
- John von Neumann –
- Norbert Wiener –
- Claude Shannon –
- Nathaniel Rochester –
- Walter Pitts –
- Warren McCullough –

==== 1950s (the founders) ====
- John McCarthy –
- Marvin Minsky –
- Allen Newell –
- Herbert A. Simon –

==== 1960s (their students) ====
- Edward Feigenbaum –
- Raj Reddy –
- Seymour Papert –
- Ray Solomonoff –

==== 1970s ====
- Douglas Hofstadter –

==== 1980s ====
- Judea Pearl –
- Rodney Brooks –

==== 1990s ====
- Yoshua Bengio –
- Hugo de Garis – known for his research on the use of genetic algorithms to evolve neural networks using three-dimensional cellular automata inside field programmable gate arrays.
- Geoffrey Hinton
- * Yann LeCun – former Chief AI Scientist at Meta Platforms, Executive Chairman of AMI Labs (Advanced Machine Intelligence Labs), and founding director of the NYU Center for Data Science.
- Ray Kurzweil – developed optical character recognition (OCR), text-to-speech synthesis, and speech recognition systems. He has also authored multiple books on artificial intelligence and its potential promise and peril. In December 2012 Kurzweil was hired by Google in a full-time director of engineering position to "work on new projects involving machine learning and language processing". Google co-founder Larry Page and Kurzweil agreed on a one-sentence job description: "to bring natural language understanding to Google".

==== 2000s on ====
- Nick Bostrom –
- David Ferrucci – principal investigator who led the team that developed the Watson computer at IBM.
- Andrew Ng – Director of the Stanford Artificial Intelligence Lab. He founded the Google Brain project at Google, which developed very large scale artificial neural networks using Google's distributed compute infrastructure. He is also co-founder of Coursera, a massive open online course (MOOC) education platform, with Daphne Koller.
- Peter Norvig – co-author, with Stuart Russell, of Artificial Intelligence: A Modern Approach, now the leading college text in the field. He is also Director of Research at Google, Inc.
- Marc Raibert – founder of Boston Dynamics, developer of hopping, walking, and running robots.
- Stuart J. Russell – co-author, with Peter Norvig, of Artificial Intelligence: A Modern Approach, now the leading college text in the field.
- Murray Shanahan – author of The Technological Singularity, a primer on superhuman intelligence.
- Eliezer Yudkowsky – founder of the Machine Intelligence Research Institute

== See also ==
- Glossary of artificial intelligence
- List of emerging technologies
- Outline of deep learning
- Outline of machine learning
- Artificial intelligence industry in China
- Language creation in artificial intelligence
