= Sidner =

Sidner is a surname. Notable people with this surname include:

- Anders Sidner (musician) (1815–1869), Swedish musician
- Anders Sidner (priest) (1788–1852), Swedish priest
- Candace Sidner, American computer scientist
- Hedwig Sidner (1852–1929), Swedish teacher
- Ludvig Sidner (1851–1917), Swedish military officer
- Sara Sidner (born 1972), American journalist
