= 2024 in artificial intelligence =

The following is a list of events of the year 2024 in artificial intelligence.

== Events ==
=== February ===
- 15 February – OpenAI introduces Sora, a text-to-video model capable of generating videos up to one minute long.
- 15 February – Google DeepMind introduces Gemini 1.5, a multimodal AI model with a context window of up to one million tokens.
- 22 February – Google suspends Gemini's ability to generate images of people after the model produces racially diverse depictions of historically white subjects, including U.S. Founding Fathers and Wehrmacht soldiers. Sundar Pichai calls the outputs "completely unacceptable" in an internal memo; the feature does not return until August.

=== March ===
- 4 March – Anthropic introduces the Claude 3 family of multimodal AI models, consisting of Claude 3 Haiku, Sonnet, and Opus.

=== May ===
- 8 May – Google DeepMind and Isomorphic Labs introduce AlphaFold 3, an AI model capable of predicting the structure and interactions of proteins, DNA, RNA, and other biomolecules.
- 13 May – OpenAI introduces GPT-4o, a multimodal model capable of reasoning across audio, vision, and text in real time.
- 14 May – Google introduces AI Overviews to Google Search in the United States.
- 14–17 May – OpenAI co-founder and chief scientist Ilya Sutskever resigns, followed by alignment lead Jan Leike, who states publicly that the company's "safety culture and processes have taken a backseat to shiny products". OpenAI dissolves the Superalignment team, formed less than a year earlier with a pledge of 20% of the company's compute, and distributes its members across other groups.

=== July ===
- 25 July – Google DeepMind announces that AlphaProof and AlphaGeometry 2 together solved four of six problems at the International Mathematical Olympiad, comparable to a silver-medal standard, and the first time an AI system reached medal level at the competition.

=== August ===
- 1 August – The Artificial Intelligence Act, a European Union regulation establishing a common regulatory and legal framework for AI, comes into force, with obligations phased in over the following three years.

=== October ===
- 8 October – The Nobel Prize in Physics is awarded to John Hopfield and Geoffrey Hinton "for foundational discoveries and inventions that enable machine learning with artificial neural networks".
- 9 October – The Nobel Prize in Chemistry is awarded half to David Baker for computational protein design and half jointly to Demis Hassabis and John Jumper of Google DeepMind for protein structure prediction with AlphaFold. It is the first time AI-related work has been recognised in two Nobel categories in the same year.

=== December ===
- 9 December – OpenAI publicly releases the text-to-video model Sora.
- 20 December – OpenAI announces o3, which scores 75.7% on the ARC-AGI abstract-reasoning benchmark compared to 53% for the previous best system.

== See also ==
- Timeline of artificial intelligence
