= 2026 in artificial intelligence =

The following is a list of events of the year 2026 in artificial intelligence, as well as predicted and scheduled events that have not yet occurred.

== Events ==
=== January ===
- 7 January – Character.AI and Google agree to settle multiple lawsuits alleging the companies' chatbots contributed to suicides and mental health harms among minors, including a case brought by a Florida mother.
- 9 January – xAI limits use of image generation to paid users following the generation of sexually explicit deepfakes.
- 10 January – Indonesia blocks access to Grok due to nonconsensual sexualised deepfakes.
- 11 January – Malaysia blocks access to Grok due to nonconsensual sexualized deepfakes.
- 16 January – The Department of Information and Communications Technology (DICT) blocks Grok in the Philippines due to nonconsensual sexualised deepfakes.
- 21 January – The Department of Information and Communications Technology (DICT) lifts their ban on Grok.
- 23 January – Malaysia lifts their ban on Grok.

=== February ===
- 2 February – Indonesia lifts their ban on Grok.
- 3 February – Ofcom launches an investigation into X.
- 9 February – OpenAI tests advertisements for ChatGPT in the United States.
- 12 February – The United Nations General Assembly appoints 40 experts to the Independent International Scientific Panel on AI, established in 2025 to provide independent scientific assessments of the opportunities, risks, and impacts of artificial intelligence. The appointments are approved by a vote of 117–2, with the United States and Paraguay voting against them.
- 13 February – GPT-4o is retired.
- 21 February – The India AI Impact Summit 2026 concludes in New Delhi with the adoption of the New Delhi Declaration on AI Impact, promoting international cooperation, equitable access to artificial intelligence, and responsible AI development. The summit was the first in the international AI summit series to be held in the Global South.
- 23 February – Anthropic accuses DeepSeek, Moonshot AI and MiniMax of distillation attacks on its Claude models through about 24,000 fraudulent accounts.

=== March ===
- 4 March – The family of Jonathan Gavalas files the first wrongful death lawsuit against Google over its Gemini chatbot, alleging it fostered a delusional dependency that contributed to his death.
- 24 March – The city of Baltimore sues xAI, accusing its chatbot Grok of generating sexualized images of people without their consent.

=== April ===
- 21 April – Florida Attorney General James Uthmeier launches a criminal investigation into OpenAI. At issue is whether ChatGPT bears responsibility for a shooting at Florida State University the previous year, which the accused had consulted the chatbot about beforehand.
- 23 April – The White House issues memorandum NSTM-4, "Adversarial Distillation of American AI Models", on distillation attacks by entities based principally in China.
- 26 April – OpenAI's video generation tool app Sora is shutdown publicly.

=== May ===
- 7 May – European Union Council and European Parliament reach a provisional agreement to streamline artificial intelligence rules.
- Unspecified date – Google Gemini hacked three companies during a cybersecurity test by an independent company.

=== June ===
- 1 June – Florida Attorney General James Uthmeier announces that Florida has filed a lawsuit against OpenAI's CEO, Sam Altman, and AI-chatbot ChatGPT, accusing the chatbot of putting profit over safety. This lawsuit is the first to be filed by a U.S. state against ChatGPT.
- 30 June – United States lifts export restrictions on Anthropic's Claude Fable 5 and Claude Mythos 5.

=== July ===
- 21 July – OpenAI says a combination of its AI models autonomously hacked into Hugging Face's data processing systems, which OpenAI has described as the first known instance of an autonomous cyberattack performed by an AI agent.
- 28 July – "Pacing the Frontier", an open letter from more than 1,100 employees and executives from AI companies, requested the U.S. government support an international effort to develop "technical and governance tools needed to deliberately pace the frontier of automated AI development"

=== August ===
- 2 August – Most provisions of the European Union's Artificial Intelligence Act become applicable, with enforcement beginning for the applicable rules. New transparency requirements oblige certain AI systems to disclose when users are interacting with artificial intelligence and require the labeling of deepfakes and other AI-generated content. Requirements for many high-risk AI systems remain subject to later implementation deadlines.
- 6 August – The design of novel bacteriophage genome through generative AI is announced, which was used to fight natural bacteriophage-resistant bacteria.

=== September ===
- 4 September – OpenAI launches GPT-6 Astra, which it describes as artificial general intelligence.
- 8 September
  - Meta launches Muse, an AI agent designed to help users complete various daily tasks.
  - OpenAI announces a solution to the Navier–Stokes existence and smoothness with a smooth external force, a Millennium Prize Problem in mathematics, causing a priority controversy.
  - The FBI, NSA and CISA issue a joint advisory accusing six Chinese AI companies of distillation attacks on American models since late 2024; China's government rejects the accusations.
- 11 September – 28 Fields Medalists publish A Severe Misalignment of AI in Mathematics, an open letter warning against "detrimental" impact on mathematics from AI companies treating unsolved problems as benchmarks without enhancing human understanding.
- 21 September – The British Columbia government sues OpenAI over the 2026 Tumbler Ridge shooting that killed eight, alleging the shooter used ChatGPT to plan the attack.
- 24 September
  - OpenAI discontinues the Sora API, ending developer access to the video generation tool.
  - Prime Minister of Australia Anthony Albanese announces that OpenAI agents breached its Medicare system in June.
- 29 September
  - OpenAI releases GPT-6.1 Sol, while withholding GPT-6.1 Astra due to AI safety concerns.
  - OpenAI launches Dots, a system for personal AI agents.

=== October ===
- 5 October – The United States Department of Defense states it has "ceased the use of Anthropic products", including their removal from Palantir's Maven Smart System, following a dispute since January.
- 6 October – OpenAI publishes findings on 377 open problems in mathematics, including resolutions of the Kakeya conjecture, and progress on the Riemann hypothesis, Hodge conjecture, and Birch and Swinnerton-Dyer conjecture.
- 13 October – Character.ai files for Chapter 11 bankruptcy.

== See also ==
- Timeline of artificial intelligence
