= 2021 in artificial intelligence =

Timeline of major events in artificial intelligence during 2021

The following is a list of events of the year 2021 in artificial intelligence.

== Events ==
- Anthropic is founded.

=== January ===
- January 5 – DALL-E is released.
- January 5 – OpenAI introduces CLIP, a neural network trained to learn visual concepts from natural language supervision.

=== April ===
- April 21 – The European Commission proposes the Artificial Intelligence Act, the first comprehensive legal framework for artificial intelligence, establishing rules based on different levels of risk.

=== May ===
- May 18 – Google introduces LaMDA, a language model designed for dialogue applications.
- May 18 – Google introduces the Multitask Unified Model (MUM), a model designed to perform multiple tasks and work across multiple languages and modalities.

=== June ===
- June 29 – GitHub announces GitHub Copilot for technical preview.

=== July ===
- July 15 – DeepMind publishes its AlphaFold 2 protein structure prediction system in Nature and releases its source code.
- July 22 – DeepMind and EMBL-EBI launch the AlphaFold Protein Structure Database, providing more than 350,000 predicted protein structures, including the human proteome, for open access.

=== August ===
- August 10 – OpenAI introduces Codex, a GPT-3-based model designed to translate natural language into code and used to power GitHub Copilot.

=== October ===
- October 22 – NATO adopts its first strategy on artificial intelligence, establishing principles for the responsible use of AI in defence and security.

=== November ===
- November 23 – UNESCO adopts the Recommendation on the Ethics of Artificial Intelligence, the first global standard on AI ethics.

=== December ===
- December 8 – DeepMind introduces Gopher, a 280-billion-parameter language model that achieves strong performance across a broad range of language tasks.

== See also ==
- Timeline of artificial intelligence
