= 2018 in artificial intelligence =

The following is a list of events of the year 2018 in artificial intelligence.

== Events ==
=== March ===
- 18 March – A self-driving Uber test vehicle strikes and kills pedestrian Elaine Herzberg in Tempe, Arizona, the first recorded pedestrian fatality involving an autonomous vehicle. Uber suspends its self-driving car testing nationwide.

=== April ===
- 25 April – The European Commission publishes its "Artificial Intelligence for Europe" communication, outlining a European strategy on AI investment, socio-economic adaptation, and ethical and legal frameworks.

=== May ===
- 8 May – Google unveils Duplex, an AI system capable of making phone calls and holding humanlike conversations to book appointments, at Google I/O.

=== June ===
- 7 June – Google publishes a set of AI principles ruling out the development of weapons and mass-surveillance technologies, following employee protests over Project Maven.

=== August ===
- 23 August – OpenAI Five, a team of AI agents, loses two exhibition matches against professional human players at Dota 2's The International tournament.

=== December ===
- 3 December – DeepMind's AlphaFold wins the 13th CASP protein structure prediction competition, marking a major advance in computational biology.

== See also ==
- Timeline of artificial intelligence
