= 2019 in artificial intelligence =

The following is a list of events of the year 2019 in artificial intelligence.

== Events ==
=== January ===
- 24 January – DeepMind's AlphaStar defeats professional StarCraft II players for the first time, winning 10 of 11 games against pros Dario "TLO" Wünsch and Grzegorz "MaNa" Komincz.

=== February ===
- 14 February – OpenAI announces GPT-2, but withholds public release of the full model citing concerns about malicious use.

=== March ===
- 11 March – OpenAI restructures from a nonprofit into OpenAI LP, a "capped-profit" company, to raise investment capital.

=== April ===
- 8 April – The European Commission's High-Level Expert Group on Artificial Intelligence publishes its final Ethics Guidelines for Trustworthy AI.

=== May ===
- 22 May – The OECD adopts the OECD Principles on Artificial Intelligence, the first intergovernmental standard on AI, endorsed by 42 countries.

=== June ===
- 9 June – The G20 adopts the G20 AI Principles, drawn from the OECD Recommendation, as part of the G20 Ministerial Statement on Trade and Digital Economy.

=== July ===
- 22 July – Microsoft announces a $1 billion investment in OpenAI as part of a multi-year partnership to develop artificial general intelligence and cloud supercomputing technology.

=== October ===
- 30 October – DeepMind's AlphaStar becomes the first AI to reach Grandmaster level in StarCraft II without any in-game restrictions, in research published in Nature.

=== November ===
- 5 November – OpenAI releases the full version of GPT-2, having previously withheld it since the February announcement.

== See also ==
- Timeline of artificial intelligence
