= Timeline of optical character recognition =

This is a timeline of optical character recognition.

== Overview ==
Time period	Summary
1870–1931	Earliest ideas of optical character recognition (OCR) are conceived. Fournier d'Albe's Optophone and Tauschek's Reading Machine are developed as devices to help the blind read.
1931–1954	First OCR tools are invented and applied in industry, able to interpret Morse code and read text out loud. The Intelligent Machines Research Corporation is the first company created to sell such tools.
1954–1974	The Optacon, the first portable OCR device, is developed. Similar devices are used to digitise Reader's Digest coupons and postal addresses. Special typefaces are designed to facilitate scanning.
1974–2000	Scanners are used massively to read price tags and passports. Companies such as Caere Corporation, ABBYY and Kurzweil Computer Products Inc, are created. The latter one develops the first omni-font OCR software, capable of reading any text document.
2000–2016	OCR software is made available online for free, through products like Adobe Acrobat, WebOCR, and Google Drive.

== Timeline ==
Year	Event type	Technology	Details
1870	Invention		American inventor Charles R. Carey invents the retina scanner, an image transmission system using a mosaic of photocells, considered the first OCR invention in the world.
1885	Invention	Image scanner	Paul Nipkow invents the Nipkow disk, an image scanning device that later will be a major breakthrough both for modern television and reading machines.
1900	Invention		Russian scientist Tyurin envisions the first OCR machine to serve as an aid to the visually handicapped, but never manages to develop it.
1912	Product	Text-to-speech	Edmund Fournier d'Albe develops the Optophone, a handheld scanner that when moved across a printed page, produces tones that corresponded to specific letters or characters, so as to be interpreted by a blind person.
1915	Patent	Text-to-telegraph	Hyman Eli Goldberg is granted a patent for his "Controller" (U.S. Patent 1165663), a device for reading perforated or conductive-ink characters and converting them into electrical signals for transmission as telegraph code.
1916	Patent		American engineer John B. Flowers patents the "One-Eyed Machine Stenographer", a machine capable of reading and typing a script. It worked by superimposing all the letters to find a point that marked each of them.
1921	Invention	Text-to-tactile sensations	Italian professor Ciro Codelupi envisions the "Reading machine for the blind", capable of transforming luminous sensations into tactile sensations.
1929	Invention		Austrian engineer Gustav Tauschek creates the first OCR device called the "Reading Machine", with a photo-sensor pointing light on words when they corresponded to a content template in its memory.
1931	Patent	Optical information retrieval	Emanuel Goldberg is granted a patent for his "Statistical machine" (U.S. Patent 1838389), an optical and photoelectric system for searching and selecting information in statistical records.
1938	Invention		MIT professor Vannevar Bush develops the Microfilm Rapid Selector, a similar but simpler Goldberg' statistical machine, and 40 times faster.
1949	Application		Engineers working on the Radio Corporation of America start a project to help the blind and the U.S. Department of Veterans Affairs, using the first text-to-speech techniques.
1951	Invention	Text & Morse-to-speech	American cryptoanalyst David H. Shepard and Harvey Cook Jr. build "Gismo", a machine able to read aloud letter by letter and interpret Morse code (U.S. Patent 2,663,758).
1952	Company		The Intelligent Machines Research Corporation is founded by D. Shepard and William Lawless Jr, to commercialise Gismo (later renamed to "Analysing Reader").
1954	Application		American magazine Reader's Digest becomes the first business to install an OCR reader, used to convert typewritten sales reports into punched cards.
1962	Invention	Portability	Stanford professor John Linvill develops the Optacon, the first portable reading device for the blind.
1965	Application		Reader's Digest expands its OCR use to digitise serial numbers of coupons. with a RCA 501 computer.
1965	Invention		American inventor Jacob Rabinow develops an OCR machine to sort mail from the US Post Office.
1966	Invention	Handwriting scanner	The IBM Rochester lab develops the IBM 1287, the first scanner capable of reading any handwritten numbers.
1966	Patent		Linvill is granted the patent for the Optacon, described as "Reading aid for the blind" (U.S. patent 3229387).
1968	Invention	Typefaces	American Type Founders and Swiss designer Adrian Frutiger introduced OCR-A and OCR-B; typefaces made to facilitate OCR operations.
1969			The US Army implemented what may have been one of the first major applications using OCR technology by converting their manual allotment program to a centralized system using IBM 360 computers. The process involved the purchase of IBM Selectric typewriters using Time Roman font 12 for all of its finance offices around the world. This application allowed all military personnel to allot portions of their paycheck through automated payroll deductions to pay bills, send to savings, etc. which eliminated monthly processing. The success of this program paved the way for all military services to follow and eventually led to the conversion to a fully automated pay system years later.
1971	Application	Postal scanner	Canadian postal operator Canada Post starts using OCR systems, to read the name and address on the envelopes and to print barcodes, using ultraviolet ink (U.S. Patent 5420403).
1974	Company	Omni-font	American inventor Ray Kurzweil creates Kurzweil Computer Products Inc., which develops the first omni-font OCR software, able to recognize text printed in virtually any font.
1976	Company		Dallas company Recognition Equipment Inc. is founded to read credit card receipts from gasoline purchases (U.S. Patent 4027141).
1977	Company	Commercialisation	Robert Noyce founds the Caere Corporation (now Nuance Communications), and introduces the first commercial handheld OCR reader.
1978	Product		Kurzweil Computer Products begins selling a commercial version of the OCR computer program, called the "Kurzweil Reading Machine".
1980	Selling		Kurzweil's company is sold to Xerox, who renamed it as Scansoft (now merged with Nuance Communications).
1984	Product	Passport scanner	Caere Corporation develops the first passport scanner for the U.S. State Department.
1987	Application	Price tag scanner	American retailers Sears, Kmart and J.C. Penney start using OCR to scan price tags.
1989	Company		OCR Russian company ABBYY is founded by David Yang, and starts selling products intended to simplify converting paper files to digital data.
1992	Invention		The first program that recognizes Cyrillic is invented by Russian company OKRUS.
2000	Application	Online service	OCR technology is made available online as a service (WebOCR), in a cloud computing environment, as well as in mobile applications like real-time translation of foreign-language signs on a smartphone.
2005	Application	Software	The free cross-platform OCR engine Tesseract is published by Hewlett Packard and the University of Nevada, Las Vegas.
2008	Application		Adobe Acrobat starts including support for OCR on any PDF file.
2011	Application	Word-frequency lookup	Google Ngram Viewer is developed to chart frequencies of words on any source printed from 1950 to 2008.
2013	Application		The MNIST database is created to train machine learning models in pattern recognition.
2015	Application	Open access	Google offers OCR tools to scan any Google Drive files in over 200 languages for free.

== See also ==
- Optical character recognition
- Handwriting recognition
