= 2017 in artificial intelligence =

The following is a list of events of the year 2017 in artificial intelligence.

== Events ==
=== January ===
- 5–8 January – The Future of Life Institute holds the Asilomar Conference on Beneficial AI, resulting in the 23 Asilomar AI Principles, later endorsed by thousands of AI researchers including Elon Musk and Stephen Hawking.
- 30 January – Libratus, an AI developed at Carnegie Mellon University, defeats four top professional players in a 20-day, 120,000-hand heads-up no-limit Texas hold 'em tournament, the first time an AI has beaten top humans at the game.

=== July ===
- 20 July – China's State Council releases its "New Generation Artificial Intelligence Development Plan," a national strategy aiming to make China the world leader in AI by 2030.

=== October ===
- 18 October – DeepMind publishes its Nature paper on AlphaGo Zero, a version of AlphaGo that reached superhuman strength through self-play alone, without training on human game data.
- 25 October – Saudi Arabia grants citizenship to Sophia, a humanoid robot developed by Hanson Robotics, making it the first robot in the world to receive legal personhood.

=== November ===
- November 12 – Future of Life Institute release Slaughterbots, an arms-control advocacy video presenting a dramatized near-future scenario where swarms of inexpensive microdrones use artificial intelligence and facial recognition software to assassinate political opponents based on preprogrammed criteria.

=== December ===
- 5 December – DeepMind releases a preprint on AlphaZero, which achieved superhuman play in chess and shogi within hours of self-play training, outperforming the leading programs Stockfish and Elmo.

== Predictions ==
- In a 2017 survey, machine learning researchers said AI will outperform humans in translating languages (by 2024), writing high-school essays (by 2026), driving a truck (by 2027), working in retail (by 2031), writing a bestselling book (by 2049) and working as a surgeon (by 2053).

== See also ==
- Timeline of artificial intelligence
