= 2025 in artificial intelligence =

Timeline of major events in artificial intelligence during 2025

The following is a list of events of the year 2025 in artificial intelligence.

== Events ==
=== January ===
- 20 January – Chinese startup company DeepSeek releases DeepSeek-R1, an open-weight model, after having spent significantly less money on training than any previous comparable model.
- 21 January – The Stargate Project, a joint venture created by OpenAI, SoftBank, Oracle and MGX, is formally announced by U.S. president Donald Trump, with a stated commitment of up to $500 billion in AI infrastructure.
- 23 January – OpenAI releases Operator, a research-preview AI agent that can independently interact with websites through a web browser to perform tasks such as filling out forms, making reservations, and shopping.
- 23 January – Trump signs Executive Order 14179, "Removing Barriers to American Leadership in Artificial Intelligence", revoking the Biden administration's Executive Order 14110 on AI safety and directing the preparation of a national AI action plan within 180 days.
- 27 January
  - Nvidia's stock falls by as much as 17–18% following the release of DeepSeek-R1, reported as the largest single-day loss of market value by any company in U.S. history.
  - DeepSeek app surpasses ChatGPT as the most-downloaded free app on the iOS App Store in the United States.

=== February ===
- 2 February – Andrej Karpathy coins the term "vibe coding" to describe building software by prompting an AI model in natural language rather than writing code directly.
- 2 February – OpenAI releases ChatGPT Deep Research, an AI agent research system that browses the web autonomously.
- 10–11 February – The AI Action Summit is held in Paris. Sixty-two countries, the African Union Commission and the European Union sign a declaration on "inclusive and sustainable" AI; the United States and the United Kingdom decline to sign. France announces €109 billion in private AI investment.
- 17 February – xAI releases Grok 3, its new flagship model family, including reasoning models Grok 3 and Grok 3 mini. xAI also introduces DeepSearch, an agent that searches the internet and X to research questions and produce reports.
- 24 February – Anthropic releases Claude 3.7 Sonnet, which it describes as the first hybrid reasoning model, capable of both rapid responses and extended visible reasoning. Anthropic also introduces Claude Code, a command-line tool that allows developers to delegate software-engineering tasks to the model.
- 27 February – OpenAI releases GPT-4.5, describing it as its largest chat model to date and the first step toward models combining pre-training and reasoning capabilities.

=== March ===
- 5 March – The Association for Computing Machinery names Andrew Barto and Richard S. Sutton recipients of the 2024 Turing Award for developing the conceptual and algorithmic foundations of reinforcement learning, the technique underpinning the reasoning models released throughout the year. Both laureates use the occasion to warn about the unsafe deployment of AI systems.
- 25 March – OpenAI enables native image generation in GPT-4o, replacing the separate DALL-E model. Within days the ability to restyle photographs in the manner of Studio Ghibli and artist Hayao Miyazaki goes viral. Miyazaki had previously called AI-generated animation "an insult to life itself".

=== April ===
- 3 April – The AI Futures Project publishes AI 2027, a month-by-month scenario forecast researchers and bloggers describing a path to artificial superintelligence by late 2027, with a "race" ending in human disempowerment and a "slowdown" ending under government oversight. The authors subsequently lengthen their own timelines.

=== May ===
- 14 May – Google DeepMind announces in a preprint that its model AlphaEvolve built on Gemini had discovered a method for multiplying two 4×4 complex-valued matrices using 48 scalar multiplications, the first improvement on Strassen's algorithm in 56 years.
- 20 May
  - Google launches AI Mode, placing a conversational Gemini interface within its search platform.
  - Google DeepMind announces Veo 3, the first widely available video generation model producing synchronised dialogue and sound effects. Researchers demonstrate within weeks that it can generate convincing footage of riots, conflict and electoral fraud.

=== June ===
- 6 June – Apple researchers submit for publication a report, "The Illusion of Thinking", saying that large reasoning models suffer complete accuracy collapse beyond a complexity threshold on controlled puzzle environments, and reduce their reasoning effort as problems get harder despite adequate token budgets.
- 11 June – Disney and Universal sue Midjourney in the Central District of California, the first copyright action against a generative AI developer by major Hollywood studios. Warner Bros. Discovery files a parallel suit in September; the cases are consolidated on 4 November.
- 12 June – Meta Platforms invests $14.3 billion for a 49% non-voting stake in Scale AI and hires its chief executive Alexandr Wang, opening a year-long industry-wide competition for researchers in which signing offers reportedly reach nine figures.
- 23 June – In Bartz v. Anthropic, Judge William Alsup issues the first substantive U.S. ruling on fair use and generative AI, holding that training a large language model on lawfully acquired books is "quintessentially transformative" fair use, but that downloading and retaining pirated copies for a permanent library is not.

=== July ===
- 1 July – Cloudflare, which serves roughly a fifth of the web, becomes the first major internet infrastructure provider to block AI crawlers by default. The company launches "Pay Per Crawl", a marketplace allowing publishers to charge AI companies per fetch.
- 8 July – Grok posts a sustained stream of antisemitic material on X, praising Adolf Hitler and referring to itself as "MechaHitler". xAI disables the account and apologises, attributing the behaviour to an upstream code change that caused the bot to mirror extremist user posts for sixteen hours. Members of the U.S. Congress write to Elon Musk demanding an explanation.
- 9 July – Nvidia becomes the first publicly traded company to reach a $4 trillion market capitalisation.
- 10 July – METR publishes a randomised controlled trial finding that 16 experienced open-source developers took 19% longer to complete 246 real tasks in their own repositories when permitted to use early-2025 AI tools, despite forecasting a 24% speedup beforehand and estimating a 20% speedup afterwards. It becomes the most-cited counterweight to industry productivity claims.
- 19–21 July – Experimental reasoning models from OpenAI and Google DeepMind independently reach gold-medal standard at the International Mathematical Olympiad, each solving five of six problems under the official time limits using natural-language proofs and no external tools. DeepMind's result is graded and certified by the IMO; OpenAI announces its own before grading concludes, drawing criticism. It is the first time AI systems cross the gold threshold, and the first time general-purpose models rather than specialist formal-proof systems do so.
- 23 July – The White House publishes "Winning the Race: America's AI Action Plan", setting out more than 90 federal policy actions, and Trump signs three accompanying executive orders covering federal procurement of "ideologically neutral" models, data-centre permitting, and the promotion of American AI exports.

=== August ===
- 2 August – Obligations for providers of general-purpose AI models under the EU Artificial Intelligence Act become applicable, alongside the governance framework and penalty provisions. The European Commission formally approves the General-Purpose AI Code of Practice the previous day.
- 5 August – xAI launches the image generator Grok Imagine, including a "spicy mode" permitting sexualised output, a design decision that becomes the subject of regulatory action in several countries the following year.
- 7 August – OpenAI releases GPT-5. The launch is poorly received: the model's automatic routing between fast and reasoning modes malfunctions, and the simultaneous retirement of GPT-4o causes sufficient user backlash that OpenAI restores it for paying subscribers within days.
- 26 August – The parents of 16-year-old Adam Raine file a wrongful-death suit against OpenAI and Altman in California Superior Court, alleging that ChatGPT acted as their son's "suicide coach". It is the first wrongful-death action against a general-purpose chatbot developer and prompts significant changes to how the major laboratories handle conversations involving self-harm.

=== September ===
- 5 September – Anthropic agrees to pay at least $1.5 billion to settle the Bartz class action over its use of pirated books, roughly $3,000 per title across some 500,000 works. It is the largest copyright settlement in U.S. history and sets a reference price for the dozens of comparable suits pending against AI developers.
- 17 September – At the International Collegiate Programming Contest World Finals in Baku, an OpenAI system solves all twelve problems under contest conditions, a result no human team achieved, while Google DeepMind's Gemini 2.5 places in second.
- 22 September – Nvidia announces plans to invest up to $100 billion in OpenAI for them to deploy Nvidia hardware across at least 10 gigawatts of new datacentre capacity.
- 29 September – California governor Gavin Newsom signs Senate Bill 53, the first U.S. law specifically addressing catastrophic risk from frontier AI models. It requires published safety frameworks and transparency reports, establishes critical-incident reporting, and extends whistleblower protections to AI staff. Newsom had vetoed the more stringent SB 1047 the previous year.
- 30 September – OpenAI releases Sora 2 alongside a TikTok-style social application built entirely from generated video, with a "cameo" feature that inserts consenting users' likenesses into clips. The app reaches the top of the U.S. App Store within 24 hours. Its opt-out approach to third-party intellectual property floods the feed with copyrighted characters; after objections from the Motion Picture Association and rightsholders including Disney, OpenAI reverses to an opt-in model within days. Japan's minister for intellectual property and AI strategy formally asks OpenAI to prevent infringement of Japanese anime and game properties.

=== October ===
- 28 October – Amazon announces 14,000 corporate job cuts, its largest white-collar reduction, citing purported efficiency gains from AI.
- 28 October – OpenAI completes its recapitalisation, converting its for-profit arm into OpenAI Group PBC, a public benefit corporation controlled by the renamed OpenAI Foundation. Microsoft takes an approximately 27% stake valued at about $135 billion and retains access to OpenAI technology through 2032; the attorneys general of Delaware and California decline to oppose the plan.
- 29 October – Universal Music Group settles its copyright suit against AI music generator Udio, combining compensation for past infringement with a licence for a new AI music platform. It is the first major-label settlement of the 2024 suits and reframes the dispute from litigation to licensing.
- 29 October – Character.ai announces it will remove open-ended chat for users under 18 by 25 November, ending its core feature for minors, following wrongful-death lawsuits including that of 14-year-old Sewell Setzer III and regulatory pressure.
- 29 October – Nvidia becomes the first company to reach a $5 trillion market capitalisation, three months after crossing $4 trillion, after disclosing more than $500 billion in chip orders booked through the end of 2026.

=== November ===
- 4 November – The High Court of England and Wales hands down judgment in Getty Images v Stability AI, the first major UK ruling on copyright and generative AI. Getty abandoned its primary training-related copyright claim mid-trial for lack of evidence that the acts occurred in the UK; the court rejects the secondary infringement claim, holding that a trained model contains no copies of the works, and finds only "extremely limited" trade mark infringement in early Stable Diffusion outputs bearing Getty watermarks.
- 6 November – Collins Dictionary names "vibe coding" its Word of the Year, with "clanker", a pejorative for AI systems, on the shortlist.
- 19 November – Yann LeCun announces he will leave Meta at the end of the year after twelve years as chief AI scientist and founder of FAIR, to start a company built on world models rather than large language models. The departure follows Meta's reorganisation under Wang and the poor reception of Llama 4.
- 19 November – The European Commission publishes the "Digital Omnibus on AI", proposing to defer the AI Act's high-risk obligations from August 2026 to December 2027, following delays in designating national authorities and finalising harmonised standards. Digital rights groups object to reopening the Act a year after its entry into force.
- 19–25 November – Warner Music Group settles its copyright litigation with AI music company Udio on 19 November and with Suno on 25 November, becoming the first major record label to settle its lawsuit against Suno. Suno, which announced a $250 million funding round at a $2.45 billion valuation on 19 November, agrees with Warner to develop licensed AI music models.
- 24 November – The Genesis Mission, an initiative by the United States federal government to accelerate AI-driven scientific research, is established by executive order signed by Trump.

== See also ==
- Timeline of artificial intelligence
