= 2023 in artificial intelligence =

Timeline of major events in artificial intelligence during 2023

The following is a list of events of the year 2023 in artificial intelligence.

== Events ==
=== January ===
- January 26 – Google announces MusicLM, a model for generating high-fidelity music from text descriptions.

=== February ===
- February 2 – ChatGPT has more than 100 million users, making it the fastest-growing consumer application to date.
- February 6 – Google announces Bard, a generative artificial intelligence chatbot powered by LaMDA.
- February 24 – Meta AI introduces LLaMA, a family of large language models ranging from 7 billion to 65 billion parameters and makes them available to the research community.

=== March ===
- March 14 – OpenAI introduces GPT-4, a large multimodal model capable of accepting image and text inputs and generating text outputs.
- March 14 – Anthropic introduces Claude, a conversational AI assistant available through a chat interface and API.
- March 30 – AutoGPT is released, an open-source "AI agent" that given a goal in natural language, will attempt to achieve it by breaking it into sub-tasks.

=== May ===
- May 30 – Hundreds of artificial intelligence experts and other notable figures sign the Statement on AI Risk.

=== July ===
- July 11 – Anthropic releases Claude 2, making the model available through a public-facing website and API.
- July 18 – Meta AI releases Llama 2, a family of large language models ranging from 7 billion to 70 billion parameters, for research and commercial use.

=== October ===
- October 3 – OpenAI introduces DALL-E 3, a text-to-image model designed to follow detailed natural-language prompts more accurately than its predecessors.
- October 30 – US president Joe Biden signs the Executive Order on the Safe, Secure, and Trustworthy Development and Use of Artificial Intelligence.

=== November ===
- November 6 – OpenAI introduces GPTs, customizable versions of ChatGPT that combine instructions, additional knowledge, and capabilities for specific purposes.

=== December ===
- December 6 – Google DeepMind introduces Gemini, a family of multimodal AI models designed to understand and combine information across text, images, audio, video, and code.

== See also ==
- Timeline of artificial intelligence
