= 2020 in artificial intelligence =

Timeline of major events in artificial intelligence during 2020

The following is a list of events of the year 2020 in artificial intelligence.

== Events ==
=== February ===
- February 13 – Microsoft introduces its Turing Natural Language Generation (T-NLG), which has 17 billion parameters.

=== April ===
- April 29 – Facebook AI Research introduces Blender, an open-domain chatbot that Facebook claims outperforms Google's Meena in conversational ability.

=== May ===
- May 28 – OpenAI publishes research paper introducing GPT-3, an autoregressive language model with 175 billion parameters.

=== June ===
- June – OpenAI launches GPT-3 API in private beta.

=== July ===
- July 30 – Facebook AI Research introduces BlenderBot 2, an open-domain chatbot with long-term memory and the ability to search the internet for information.

=== August ===
- August 4 – DeepMind releases computational predictions of the structures of several SARS-CoV-2 proteins using its AlphaFold system.

=== September ===
- September 22 – OpenAI licenses GPT-3 to Microsoft.

=== November ===
- November 30 – DeepMind's artificial intelligence AlphaFold 2 reaches levels of accuracy much higher than any other entry in the 14th Critical Assessment of Structure Prediction (CASP).

=== December ===
- December 23 – DeepMind introduces MuZero, a reinforcement learning system that masters Go, chess, shogi, and Atari games without being given their rules.

== See also ==
- Timeline of artificial intelligence
