= 2022 in artificial intelligence =

Timeline of major events in artificial intelligence during 2022

The following is a list of events of the year 2022 in artificial intelligence.

== Events ==
The number of Google searches for the term "AI" began to increase in about 2022.

=== January ===
- January 27 – OpenAI introduces InstructGPT, a family of language models fine-tuned with reinforcement learning from human feedback to better follow user instructions.

=== April ===
- April 4 – Google introduces PaLM, a 540-billion-parameter language model designed to generalize across multiple domains and tasks.
- April 6 – OpenAI introduces DALL-E 2, a generative model capable of creating and editing images from natural language descriptions.
- April 12 – DeepMind introduces Chinchilla, a 70-billion-parameter language model that outperforms larger models, including Gopher, on a range of benchmarks.

=== May ===
- May 3 – Meta AI releases OPT-175B, a 175-billion-parameter language model trained on publicly available datasets and made available to the research community.
- May 23 – Google introduces Imagen, a text-to-image diffusion model capable of generating photorealistic images from natural language descriptions.

=== August ===
- August 22 – Stability AI releases Stable Diffusion, an open-source text-to-image model with publicly available model weights.

=== November ===
- November 30 – OpenAI launches ChatGPT, a generative artificial intelligence chatbot.

== See also ==
- Timeline of artificial intelligence
