= 2029 in artificial intelligence =

The following is a list of events of the year 2029 in artificial intelligence, as well as predicted and scheduled events that have not yet occurred.

== Events ==
- The Stargate Project, a joint venture created by OpenAI, SoftBank, Oracle and MGX, plans on investing up to US$500 billion in AI infrastructure in the United States by 2029.

== Predictions ==
- Ray Kurzweil claims that a machine will pass the Turing test by 2029.

== In fiction ==
- Under the leadership of John Connor, the human resistance eventually destroys Skynet's defense grid in 2029. In a last effort, Skynet sends a cyborg Terminator, the Model 101, back in time to 1984 to kill Connor's mother Sarah before she could give birth to John.

== See also ==
- Timeline of artificial intelligence
