= Project Mariner =

Research prototype by Google DeepMind

- Developer: Google DeepMind
- Release: December 11, 2024 (Research prototype)
- Stable release: 2025 Update / May 20, 2025; 17 months ago
- Engine: Gemini 2.0 / Gemini 2.5
- Operating system: Web browser
- Platform: Google Chrome, Cloud-based VM
- Type: AI agent, Automation
- License: Proprietary (SaaS)
- Website: deepmind.google/models/project-mariner/

Project Mariner was a research prototype developed by Google DeepMind that explored human-agent interactions, particularly within web browsers. It automated tasks such as online shopping, information retrieval, and form-filling, aiming to enhance user productivity by delegating routine web-based tasks to an AI agent.

== Browser extension ==
Project Mariner operated as an experimental Chrome extension that understands the contents of your screen, including images, code, forms, and more. It could interpret complex goals, plan actionable steps, and navigate websites to carry out tasks, while keeping the user informed and allowing them to intervene at any time.

As of May 2025, Project Mariner was available to Google AI Ultra subscribers in the US and was being integrated into the Gemini API and Vertex AI, allowing developers to build applications powered by the agent Google plans to bring Project Mariner’s capabilities to more countries and integrate it into Google Search's AI Mode, which was currently in the Search Labs testing phase.

Project Mariner was discontinued on May 4, 2026.
