= John Jumper =

John Jumper may refer to:

- John Jumper (Seminole chief), principal chief of the Seminole Nation
- John M. Jumper, A Nobel Prize winning American chemist and computer scientist
- John P. Jumper, United States Air Force general
