= David H. Shepard =

David Hammond Shepard
- Born: September 30, 1923; Milwaukee, Wisconsin
- Died: November 24, 2007 (aged 84)
- Education: Cornell University; University of Michigan
- Known for: optical character recognition speech recognition
- Scientific career
- Fields: electrical engineering

David Hammond Shepard (September 30, 1923 – November 24, 2007) was an American inventor, who invented among other things, the first optical character recognition device, first voice recognition system and the Farrington B numeric font used on credit cards.

== Life ==
Shepard was born September 30, 1923, in Milwaukee. His father died when he was 2 and his mother when he was 10. His guardian was Laurens Hammond who invented the Hammond organ. He graduated in electrical engineering from Cornell in 1945 and then University of Michigan with a master's degree in mathematics in 1947. He worked during World War II for the Armed Forces Security Agency (now National Security Agency) on cryptanalysis, breaking Japanese codes. His nickname was "D-Shep" and "Party Shep" After the war he built an optical character recognition device (reading machine) in his attic with Harvey Cook Jr. called "Gismo". In 1952 he formed Intelligent Machines Research Corporation to commercialize the invention with William Lawless Jr. in Arlington, Virginia.

IBM licensed the machine, but never put it into production. Shepard designed the Farrington B numeric font now used on most credit cards. Recognition was more reliable on a simple and open font, to avoid the effects of smearing at gasoline station pumps. Reading credit cards was the first major industry use of OCR, although today the information is read magnetically from the back of the cards.

In 1962 Shepard founded Cognitronics Corporation. In 1964 his patented "Conversation Machine" was the first to provide telephone Interactive voice response access to computer stored data using speech recognition. The first words recognized were "yes" and "no".

Since the 1980s he worked on high altitude wind power, harnessing winds at high altitudes to generate power. He founded Sky WindPower Corporation with Australian Bryan William Roberts of the University of Sydney. Shepard died in San Diego of bronchiectasis on November 24, 2007, at the age of 84.

== Patents ==
- Low output impedance feedback power amplifier
- Time interval marking apparatus
- US Patent 4572962 Apparatus for extracting energy from winds at high altitudes by David H. Shepard, filed April 28, 1982.
- US Patent 4659940 Power generation from high altitude winds by David H. Shepard, filed Oct 11, 1985.
- US Patent 7109598 Precisely controlled flying electric generators III by Bryan William Roberts and David Hammond Shepard, filed Oct 18, 2004.
- US Patent 7183663 Precisely controlled flying electric generators by Bryan William Roberts and David Hammond Shepard, filed Aug 17, 2004.
