= Candace Sidner =

American computer scientist

Candace Lee (Candy) Sidner is an American computer scientist whose research has applied artificial intelligence and natural language processing to problems in personal information management, intelligent user interfaces, and human–robot interaction. She is a retired research professor of computer science at the Worcester Polytechnic Institute and a former president of the Association for Computational Linguistics. She is a Fellow of the Association for the Advancement of Artificial Intelligence, and a Fellow of the Association of Computational Linguistics.

== Education and career ==
Sidner majored in mathematics at Kalamazoo College, graduating in 1971. She earned a master's degree in computer science at the University of Pittsburgh in 1975, and completed a Ph.D. in computer science in 1979 at the Massachusetts Institute of Technology. Her dissertation, Towards A Computational Theory of Definite Anaphora Comprehension in English Discourse, was supervised by Jonathan Allen.

She worked as a research scientist for Bolt Beranek and Newman from 1979 to 1989, and continued to work in industry for the Digital Equipment Corporation (1989 to 1993), the Lotus Development Corporation (1993 to 2000), Mitsubishi Electric Research Laboratories (2000 to 2007), and BAE Systems (2007 to 2010). She took a position as a research professor at the Worcester Polytechnic Institute in 2009.

Sidner has served on numerous boards, journals and conference committees. She was General Chair, ACM International Conference on Intelligent User Interfaces, 2001; General Chair, HLT-NAACL (Human Language Technologies-North American Association for Computational Linguistics) Conference, 2007 and co-chair of SIGDIAL 2004. She served on the Advisory Boards of Intelligent User Interfaces, 2006-2010; and of SIGDIAL , 2006 – 2012. She was also a councillor of the Association for the Advancement of Artificial Intelligence, 1991–1994. She was an associate editor of the journal Artificial Intelligence from 2009-2012; an associate editor of ACM Transactions on Intelligent Interactive Systems, 2011- to 2015.

She served as president of the Association for Computational Linguistics in 1989.

== Recognition ==
Sidner was named a Fellow of the Association for the Advancement of Artificial Intelligence in 1991. In 2013, she was named a Fellow of the Association for Computational Linguistics, "for seminal contributions to discourse focus and collaborative dialog".
