= Timeline of machine translation =

This is a timeline of machine translation. For a more detailed qualitative account, see the history of machine translation page.

== Timeline ==
Year	Month and date (if available)	Event type	Event
1924	February	Proposal	The first known machine translation proposal was made in Estonia and involved a typewriter-translator.
1933	July 5	Proposal	Georges Artsrouni patents a general-purpose device with many potential applications in France. He seems to have been working on the device since 1929.
1933	September 5	Proposal	Peter Petrovich Troyanskii is awarded an author's certificate (patent) for a proposal to use a mechanized dictionary for translation between languages.
1939-1944		Proposal	Troyanskii approaches the Academy of Sciences in Russia with his proposal for machine translation, seeking to work with linguists. Discussions continue till 1944, but not much comes out of it.
1949	July	Proposal	Warren Weaver, working for the Rockefeller Foundation in the United States, puts forward a proposal for machine translation based on information theory, successes of code breaking during the second world war and speculation about universal underlying principles of natural language.
1954	January 7	Demonstration	The Georgetown–IBM experiment, held at the IBM head office in New York City in the United States, offers the first public demonstration of machine translation. The system itself, however, is no more than what today would be called a "toy" system, having just 250 words and translating just 49 carefully selected Russian sentences into English — mainly in the field of chemistry. Nevertheless, it encourages the view that machine translation was imminent — and in particular stimulates the financing of the research, not just in the US but worldwide.
1958-1960		Report	In 1958, linguist Yehoshua Bar-Hillel travels around the world visiting machine translation centers to better understand the work they were doing. In 1959, he writes up a report (intended primarily for the US government) pointing out some key difficulties with machine translation that he believed might doom the efforts then underway. An expanded version of the report is published in 1960 in the annual review journal Advances in Computers. His main argument was that existing methods offered no way of resolving semantic ambiguities whose resolution required having an understanding of the terms being used, such as the ambiguity arising from a single word having multiple meanings.
1966		Report	ALPAC publishes a report commissioned by the United States government. The report concludes that machine translation is more expensive, less accurate and slower than human translation, and that despite the expenses, machine translation is not likely to reach the quality of a human translator in the near future. It recommends that tools be developed to aid translators — automatic dictionaries, for example — and that some research in computational linguistics should continue to be supported. The report causes a significant decline in government funding for machine translation in the US, and to a lesser extent in the UK and Russia.
1968		Creation of organization	SYSTRAN is started by Peter Toma.
1970		Creation of organization	Logos Corporation is started by Bernard Scott, funded by the US government to translate US military manuals into Vietnamese for the Vietnamization policy.
1977		Deployment	The METEO System, developed at the Université de Montréal, is installed in Canada to translate weather forecasts from English to French, and is translating close to 80,000 words per day or 30 million words per year until it is replaced by a competitor's system on 30 September 2001.
1984		Proposal	Makoto Nagao proposes example-based machine translation. The idea is to break down sentences into phrases (subsentential units) and learn the translations of those phrases using a corpus of examples. With enough phrases known, new sentences that combine existing phrases in a novel manner can be translated.
1997		Web translation tool	The world's first web translation tool, Babel Fish, has launched as a subdomain of the AltaVista search engine. The tool was created by Systran in collaboration with Digital Equipment Corporation.
2006	April	Web translation tool	Google Translate has launched.
2017	August	Web translation tool	DeepL Translator has launched.
2024	November	Live translation tool	DeepL Voice has launched. It can translate live audio from the languages English, German, Japanese, Korean, Swedish, Dutch, French, Turkish, Polish, Portuguese, Russian, Spanish, and Italian.
2025	February	Deployment	Google Cloud's Translation LLM begins supporting translation directly between any of its supported source and target languages, without English having to be either the source or the target, reducing latency and improving quality for enterprise translation workflows.
2025	November	Expansion	DeepL expands to more than 100 supported languages, adding around 70 new languages in beta for enterprise customers; the expansion includes the platform's first Sub-Saharan African and South Asian languages and completes coverage of all 24 official European Union languages.
2025	December	Deployment	Google rolls out Gemini-powered upgrades to Google Translate: more natural translations of idioms, slang and local expressions in nearly 20 languages, a beta of live speech-to-speech translation through headphones in more than 70 languages, and expanded language-practice tools.
2026	January	Open source model	Google releases TranslateGemma, a family of open-weight translation models built on Gemma 3 (4B, 12B, and 27B parameters, covering 55 languages). The 12B version outperforms the twice-as-large Gemma 3 27B on the WMT24++ benchmark, achieving higher translation quality with less than half the parameters, with all weights released openly.
2026	April	Deployment	DeepL launches Voice-to-Voice, a real-time speech-to-speech translation suite for meetings (Microsoft Teams, Zoom), in-person conversations, and customer support scenarios, covering more than 40 languages and including an API.
2026	August		Google DeepMind announces SL2T, a multilingual sign-language-to-text translation model trained on more than 100,000 hours of signing data across over 50 sign languages.

== See also ==
- Timeline of machine learning
