= Timeline of artificial intelligence =

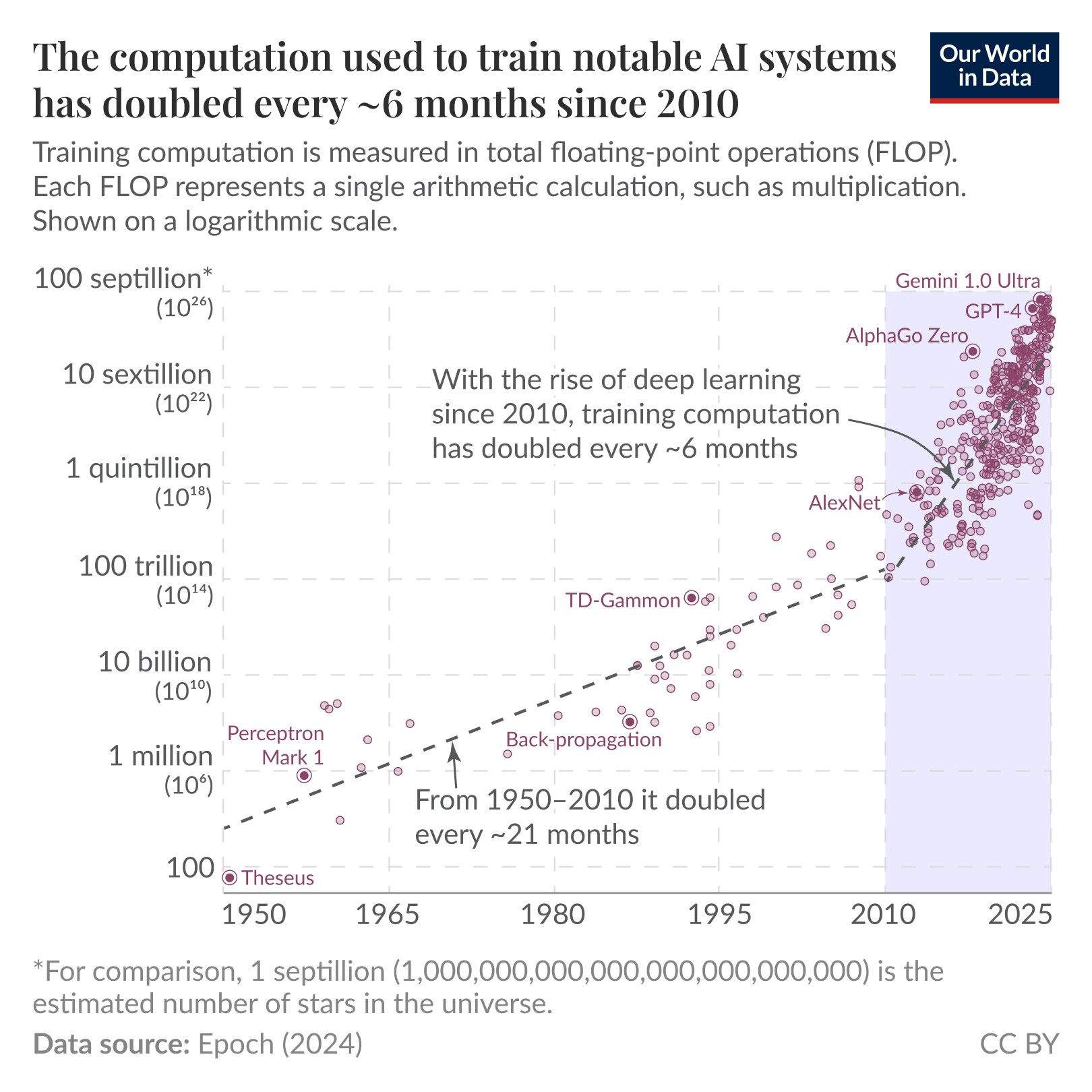
The training computation of notable AI systems through time

This is a timeline of artificial intelligence (AI), also known as synthetic intelligence.

== Antiquity, Classical and Medieval eras ==
Date	Development
Antiquity	Greek myths of Hephaestus and Pygmalion incorporated the idea of intelligent automata (such as Talos) and artificial beings (such as Galatea and Pandora).
Antiquity	Sacred mechanical statues built in Egypt and Greece were believed to be capable of wisdom and emotion. Hermes Trismegistus would write, "They have 'sensus' and 'spiritus'... by discovering the true nature of the gods, man has been able to reproduce it."
10th century BC	Yan Shi presented King Mu of Zhou with mechanical men that were capable of moving their bodies independently.
384 BC–322 BC	Aristotle described the syllogism, a method of formal, mechanical thought in the Organon. Aristotle also described means–ends analysis (an algorithm for planning) in Nicomachean Ethics, the same algorithm used by Newell and Simon's General Problem Solver (1959).
3rd century BC	Ctesibius invents a mechanical water clock with an alarm. This was the first example of a feedback mechanism.
1st century	Hero of Alexandria created mechanical men and other automatons. He produced what may have been "the world's first practical programmable machine:" an automatic theatre.
260	Porphyry wrote Isagogê which categorized knowledge and logic, including a drawing of what would later be called a "semantic net".
~800	Jabir ibn Hayyan developed the Arabic alchemical theory of Takwin, the artificial creation of life in the laboratory, up to and including human life.
9th Century	The Banū Mūsā brothers created a programmable music automaton described in their Book of Ingenious Devices: a steam-driven flute controlled by a program represented by pins on a revolving cylinder. This was "perhaps the first machine with a stored program".
9th Century	al-Khwarizmi wrote textbooks with precise step-by-step methods for arithmetic and algebra, used in Islam, India and Europe until the 16th century. The word "algorithm" is derived from his name.
1206	Ismail al-Jazari created a programmable orchestra of mechanical human beings.
1275	Ramon Llull, Mallorcan theologian, invents the Ars Magna, a tool for combining concepts mechanically based on an Arabic astrological tool, the Zairja. Llull described his machines as mechanical entities that could combine basic truth and facts to produce advanced knowledge. The method was further developed by Gottfried Wilhelm Leibniz in the 17th century.
~1500	Paracelsus claimed to have created an artificial man out of magnetism, sperm, and alchemy.
~1580	Rabbi Judah Loew ben Bezalel of Prague is said to have invented the Golem, a clay man brought to life.

== 1600–1900 ==
Date	Development
1620	Francis Bacon developed empirical theory of knowledge and introduced inductive logic in his work Novum Organum, a play on Aristotle's title Organon.
1623	Wilhelm Schickard drew a calculating clock on a letter to Kepler. This will be the first of five unsuccessful attempts at designing a direct entry calculating clock in the 17th century (including the designs of Tito Burattini, Samuel Morland and René Grillet). (Note: Please see Mechanical calculator#Other calculating machines.)
1641	Thomas Hobbes published Leviathan and presented a mechanical, combinatorial theory of cognition. He wrote "...for reason is nothing but reckoning".
1642	Blaise Pascal invented a mechanical calculator, (Note: Please see Pascal's calculator#Competing designs.) the first digital calculating machine.
1647	René Descartes proposed that bodies of animals are nothing more than complex machines (but that mental phenomena are of a different "substance").
1654	Blaise Pascal described how to find expected values in probability, in 1662 Antoine Arnauld published a formula to find the maximum expected value, and in 1663, Gerolamo Cardano's solution to the same problems was published 116 years after it was written. The theory of probability was further developed by Jacob Bernoulli and Pierre-Simon Laplace in the 18th century. Probability theory would become central to AI and machine learning from the 1990s onward.
1672	Gottfried Wilhelm Leibniz improved the earlier machines, making the Stepped Reckoner to do multiplication and division.
1676	Leibniz derived the chain rule. The rule is used by AI to train neural networks, for example the backpropagation algorithm uses the chain rule.
1679	Leibniz developed a universal calculus of reasoning (alphabet of human thought) by which arguments could be decided mechanically. It assigned a specific number to each object in the world, as a prelude to an algebraic solution to all possible problems.
1726	Jonathan Swift published Gulliver's Travels, which includes this description of the Engine, a machine on the island of Laputa: "a Project for improving speculative Knowledge by practical and mechanical Operations" by using this "Contrivance", "the most ignorant Person at a reasonable Charge, and with a little bodily Labour, may write Books in Philosophy, Poetry, Politicks, Law, Mathematicks, and Theology, with the least Assistance from Genius or study." The machine is a parody of Ars Magna, one of the inspirations of Gottfried Wilhelm Leibniz' mechanism.
1738	Daniel Bernoulli introduces the concept of "utility", a generalization of probability, the basis of economics and decision theory, and the mathematical foundation for the way AI represents the "goals" of intelligent agents.
1739	David Hume described induction, the logical method of learning generalities from examples.
1750	Julien Offray de La Mettrie published L'Homme Machine, which argued that human thought is strictly mechanical.
1763	Thomas Bayes's work An Essay Towards Solving a Problem in the Doctrine of Chances, published two years after his death, laid the foundations of Bayes' theorem and used in modern AI in Bayesian networks.
1769	Wolfgang von Kempelen built and toured with his chess-playing automaton, The Turk, which Kempelen claimed could defeat human players. The Turk was later shown to be a hoax, involving a human chess player.
1795–1805	The simplest kind of artificial neural network is the linear network. It has been known for over two centuries as the method of least squares or linear regression. It was used as a means of finding a good rough linear fit to a set of points by Adrien-Marie Legendre (1805) and Carl Friedrich Gauss (1795) for the prediction of planetary movement.
1805	Joseph Marie Jacquard created a programmable loom, based on earlier inventions by Basile Bouchon (1725), Jean-Baptiste Falcon (1728) and Jacques Vaucanson (1740). Replaceable punched cards controlled sequences of operations in the process of manufacturing textiles. This may have been the first industrial software for commercial enterprises.
1818	Mary Shelley published the story of Frankenstein; or the Modern Prometheus, a fictional consideration of the ethics of creating sentient beings.
1822–1859	Charles Babbage & Ada Lovelace worked on programmable mechanical calculating machines.
1837	The mathematician Bernard Bolzano made the first modern attempt to formalize semantics.
1854	George Boole set out to "investigate the fundamental laws of those operations of the mind by which reasoning is performed, to give expression to them in the symbolic language of a calculus", inventing Boolean algebra.
1863	Samuel Butler suggested that Darwinian evolution also applies to machines and speculates that they will one day become conscious and eventually supplant humanity.

== 20th century ==
=== 1901–1950 ===
Date	Development
1910-1913	Bertrand Russell and Alfred North Whitehead published Principia Mathematica, which showed that all of elementary mathematics could be reduced to mechanical reasoning in formal logic.
1912-1914	Leonardo Torres Quevedo built an automaton for chess endgames, El Ajedrecista. He was called "the 20th century's first AI pioneer". In his Essays on Automatics (1914), Torres published theories about thinking and automata and introduced the idea of floating-point arithmetic.
1923	Karel Čapek's play R.U.R. (Rossum's Universal Robots) opened in London. This is the first use of the word "robot" in English.
1920–1925	Wilhelm Lenz and Ernst Ising created and analyzed the Ising model (1925) which can be viewed as the first artificial recurrent neural network (RNN) consisting of neuron-like threshold elements. In 1972, Shun'ichi Amari made this architecture adaptive.
1920s and 1930s	Ludwig Wittgenstein's Tractatus Logico-Philosophicus (1921) inspires Rudolf Carnap and the logical positivists of the Vienna Circle to use formal logic as the foundation of philosophy. However, Wittgenstein's later work in the 1940s demonstrates that context-free symbolic logic is incoherent without human interpretation.
1931	Kurt Gödel encoded mathematical statements and proofs as integers and showed that there are true theorems that are unprovable by any consistent theorem-proving machine. Thus, "he identified fundamental limits of algorithmic theorem proving, computing, and any type of computation-based AI,", laying the foundations of theoretical computer science and AI theory.
1935	Alonzo Church extended Gödel's proof and showed that the decision problem of computer science does not have a general solution. He developed the Lambda calculus, which will eventually be fundamental to the theory of computer languages.
1936	Konrad Zuse filed his patent application for a program-controlled computer.
1937	Alan Turing published "On Computable Numbers", which laid the foundations of the modern theory of computation by introducing the Turing machine, a physical interpretation of "computability". He used it to confirm Gödel by proving that the halting problem is undecidable.
1940	Edward Condon displayed Nimatron, a digital machine that played Nim perfectly.
1941	Konrad Zuse built the first working program-controlled general-purpose computer.
1943	Warren Sturgis McCulloch and Walter Pitts publish "A Logical Calculus of the Ideas Immanent in Nervous Activity", the first mathematical description of an artificial neural networks.
1943	Arturo Rosenblueth, Norbert Wiener and Julian Bigelow coin the term "cybernetics". Wiener's popular book by that name was published in 1948.
1945	Game theory, which would prove invaluable in the progress of AI, was introduced with the 1944 paper "Theory of Games and Economic Behavior" by mathematician John von Neumann and economist Oskar Morgenstern.
1945	Vannevar Bush published "As We May Think" (The Atlantic Monthly, July 1945), a prescient vision of the future in which computers assist humans in many activities.
1948	Alan Turing produces the "Intelligent Machinery" report, regarded as the first manifesto of Artificial Intelligence. It introduces many concepts, including the logic-based approach to problem-solving, that intellectual activity consists mainly of various kinds of search, and a discussion of machine learning in which he anticipates the Connectionism AI approach.
1948	John von Neumann (quoted by Edwin Thompson Jaynes) in response to a comment at a lecture that it was impossible for a machine (at least ones created by humans) to think: "You insist that there is something a machine cannot do. If you will tell me precisely what it is that a machine cannot do, then I can always make a machine which will do just that!". Von Neumann was presumably alluding to the Church–Turing thesis, which states that any effective procedure can be simulated by a (generalized) computer.
1949	Donald O. Hebb develops Hebbian theory, a possible algorithm for learning in neural networks.

=== 1950s ===
Date	Development
1950	Alan Turing published "Computing Machinery and Intelligence", which proposes the Turing test as a measure of machine intelligence and answered all of the most common objections to the proposal "machines can think".
1950	Claude Shannon published a detailed analysis of chess playing as search.
1950	Isaac Asimov published his Three Laws of Robotics.
1951	The first working AI programs were written in 1951 to run on the Ferranti Mark 1 machine of the University of Manchester: A checkers-playing program written by Christopher Strachey and a chess-playing program written by Dietrich Prinz.
1952–1962	Arthur Samuel (IBM) wrote the first game-playing program, for checkers (draughts), to achieve sufficient skill to challenge a respectable amateur. His first checkers-playing program was written in 1952, and in 1955, he created a version that learned to play.
1956	The Dartmouth College summer AI conference is organized by John McCarthy, Marvin Minsky, Nathan Rochester of IBM and Claude Shannon. McCarthy coined the term artificial intelligence for the conference.
1956	The first demonstration of the Logic Theorist (LT) written by Allen Newell, Cliff Shaw and Herbert A. Simon (Carnegie Institute of Technology, now Carnegie Mellon University or CMU). This is often called the first AI program, though Samuel's checkers program also has a strong claim. This program has been described as the first deliberately engineered to perform automated reasoning, and would eventually prove 38 of the first 52 theorems in Russell and Whitehead's Principia Mathematica, and find new and more elegant proofs for some. Simon said that they had "solved the venerable mind–body problem, explaining how a system composed of matter can have the properties of mind".
1958	John McCarthy (Massachusetts Institute of Technology or MIT) invented the Lisp programming language.
1958	Herbert Gelernter and Nathan Rochester (IBM) described a theorem prover in geometry. It exploited a semantic model of the domain in the form of diagrams of "typical" cases.
1958	Teddington Conference on the Mechanization of Thought Processes was held in the UK and among the papers presented were John McCarthy's "Programs with Common Sense" (which proposed the Advice taker application as a primary research goal) Oliver Selfridge's "Pandemonium", and Marvin Minsky's "Some Methods of Heuristic Programming and Artificial Intelligence".
1959	The General Problem Solver (GPS) was created by Newell, Shaw and Simon while at CMU.
1959	John McCarthy and Marvin Minsky founded the MIT AI Lab.
Late 1950s, early 1960s	Margaret Masterman and colleagues at University of Cambridge design semantic nets for machine translation.

=== 1960s ===
Date	Development
1960s	Ray Solomonoff lays the foundations of a mathematical theory of AI, introducing universal Bayesian methods for inductive inference and prediction.
1960	"Man–Computer Symbiosis" by J.C.R. Licklider.
1961	James Slagle (PhD dissertation, MIT) wrote (in Lisp) the first symbolic integration program, SAINT, which solved calculus problems at the college-freshman level.
1961	In Minds, Machines and Gödel, John Lucas denied the possibility of machine intelligence on logical or philosophical grounds. He referred to Kurt Gödel's result of 1931: sufficiently powerful formal systems are either inconsistent or allow for formulating true theorems unprovable by any theorem-proving AI deriving all provable theorems from the axioms. Since humans are able to "see" the truth of such theorems, machines were deemed inferior.
1961	Unimation's industrial robot Unimate worked on a General Motors automobile assembly-line.
1963	Thomas Evans' program, ANALOGY, written as part of his PhD work at MIT, demonstrated that computers can solve the same analogy problems as are given on IQ tests.
1963	Edward Feigenbaum and Julian Feldman published Computers and Thought, the first collection of articles about artificial intelligence.
1963	Leonard Uhr and Charles Vossler published "A Pattern Recognition Program That Generates, Evaluates, and Adjusts Its Own Operators", which described one of the first machine-learning programs that could adaptively acquire and modify features and thereby overcome the limitations of simple perceptrons of Rosenblatt.
1964	Danny Bobrow's dissertation at MIT (technical report #1 from MIT's AI group, Project MAC), shows that computers can understand natural language well enough to solve algebra word problems correctly.
1964	In Stanisław Lem's essay-collection Summa Technologiae Lem discusses "intellectronics" (AI).
1964	Bertram Raphael's MIT dissertation on the SIR program demonstrates the power of a logical representation of knowledge for question-answering systems.
1965	In the Soviet Union, Alexey Ivakhnenko and Valentin Lapa develop the first deep-learning algorithm for multilayer perceptrons.
1965	Lotfi A. Zadeh at U.C. Berkeley publishes his first paper introducing fuzzy logic, "Fuzzy Sets" (Information and Control 8: 338–353).
1965	J. Alan Robinson invents a mechanical proof procedure, the Resolution Method, which allows programs to work efficiently with formal logic as a representation language.
1965	Joseph Weizenbaum (MIT) builds ELIZA, an interactive program that carries on a dialogue in English language on any topic. It was a popular toy at AI centers on the ARPANET when a version that "simulated" the dialogue of a psychotherapist was programmed.
1965	Edward Feigenbaum initiates Dendral, a ten-year effort to develop software to deduce the molecular structure of organic compounds using scientific instrument data. It was the first expert system.
1966	Ross Quillian (PhD dissertation, Carnegie Inst. of Technology, now CMU) demonstrates semantic nets.
1966	Machine Intelligence workshop at Edinburgh – the first of an influential annual series organized by Donald Michie and others.
1966	Negative report on machine-translation kills much work in natural language processing (NLP) for many years.
1966	Dendral program (Edward Feigenbaum, Joshua Lederberg, Bruce Buchanan, Georgia Sutherland at Stanford University) demonstrated to interpret mass spectra of organic chemical compounds. First successful knowledge-based program for scientific reasoning.
1967	Shun'ichi Amari becomes the first to use stochastic gradient descent for deep learning in multilayer perceptrons. In computer experiments conducted by his student Saito, a five-layer MLP with two modifiable layers learned useful internal representations to classify non-linearily separable pattern classes.
1968	Joel Moses (PhD work at MIT) demonstrates the power of symbolic reasoning for integration problems in the Macsyma program. First successful knowledge-based program in mathematics.
1968	Richard Greenblatt (programmer) at MIT builds a knowledge-based chess-playing program, Mac Hack, that was good enough to achieve a class-C rating in tournament play.
1968	Wallace and Boulton's program, Snob (Comp.J. 11(2) 1968), for unsupervised classification (clustering) uses the Bayesian minimum message length criterion, a mathematical realisation of Occam's razor.
1969	Stanford Research Institute (SRI): Shakey the robot, demonstrates combining animal locomotion, perception and problem-solving.
1969	Roger Schank (Stanford) defines conceptual dependency model for natural language understanding. Later developed (in PhD dissertations at Yale University) for use in story understanding by Robert Wilensky and Wendy Lehnert, and for use in understanding memory by Janet Kolodner.
1969	Yorick Wilks (Stanford) developed the semantic-coherence view of language called Preference Semantics, embodied in the first semantics-driven mac)hine-translation program, and the basis of many PhD dissertations since (such as those of Bran Boguraev and David Carter at Cambridge.
1969	First International Joint Conference on Artificial Intelligence (IJCAI) held at Stanford.
1969	Marvin Minsky and Seymour Papert publish Perceptronss, demonstrating previously unrecognized limits of this feed-forward two-layered structure. This book is considered by some to mark the beginning of the AI winter of the 1970s, a failure of confidence and funding for AI. However, by the time the book came out, methods for training multilayer perceptrons by deep learning were already known (Alexey Ivakhnenko and Valentin Lapa, 1965; Shun'ichi Amari, 1967). Significant progress in the field continued (see below).
1969	McCarthy and Hayes start the discussion about the frame problem with their essay "Some Philosophical Problems from the Standpoint of Artificial Intelligence".

=== 1970s ===
Date	Development
Early 1970s	Jane Robinson and Don Walker established an influential Natural Language Processing group at SRI.
1970	Seppo Linnainmaa publishes the reverse mode of automatic differentiation. This method became later known as backpropagation, and is heavily used to train artificial neural networks.
1970	Jaime Carbonell (Sr.) developed SCHOLAR, an interactive program for computer-assisted instruction based on semantic nets as the representation of knowledge.
1970	Bill Woods described Augmented Transition Networks (ATNs) as a representation for natural language understanding.
1970	Patrick Winston's PhD program, ARCH, at MIT, learned concepts from examples in the world of children's blocks.
1971	Terry Winograd's PhD thesis (MIT) demonstrated the ability of computers to understand English sentences in a restricted world of children's blocks, in a coupling of his language understanding program, SHRDLU, with a robot arm that carried out instructions typed in English.
1971	Work on the Boyer-Moore theorem prover started in Edinburgh.
1972	Prolog programming language developed by Alain Colmerauer.
1972	Earl Sacerdoti developed one of the first hierarchical planning programs, ABSTRIPS.
1973	The Assembly Robotics Group at University of Edinburgh builds Freddy Robot, capable of using visual perception to locate and assemble models. (See Edinburgh Freddy Assembly Robot: a versatile computer-controlled assembly system.)
1973	The Lighthill report gives a largely negative verdict on AI research in Great Britain and forms the basis for the decision by the British government to discontinue support for AI research in all but two universities.
1974	Ted Shortliffe's PhD dissertation on the MYCIN program (Stanford) demonstrated a very practical rule-based approach to medical diagnoses, even in the presence of uncertainty. While it borrowed from DENDRAL, its own contributions strongly influenced the future of expert system development, especially commercial systems.
1975	Earl Sacerdoti developed techniques of partial-order planning in his NOAH system, replacing the previous paradigm of search among state space descriptions. NOAH was applied at SRI International to interactively diagnose and repair electromechanical systems.
1975	Austin Tate developed the Nonlin hierarchical planning system, able to search a space of partial plans characterised as alternative approaches to the underlying goal structure of the plan.
1975	Marvin Minsky published his widely read and influential article on Frames as a representation of knowledge, in which many ideas about schemas and semantic links are brought together.
1975	The Meta-Dendral learning program produced new results in chemistry (some rules of mass spectrometry), the first scientific discoveries by a computer to be published in a refereed journal.
Mid-1970s	Barbara Grosz (SRI) established limits to traditional AI approaches to discourse modeling. Subsequent work by Grosz, Bonnie Webber and Candace Sidner developed the notion of "centering", used in establishing focus of discourse and anaphoric references in Natural language processing.
Mid-1970s	David Marr and MIT colleagues describe the "primal sketch" and its role in visual perception.
1976	Douglas Lenat's AM program (Stanford PhD dissertation) demonstrated the discovery model (loosely guided search for interesting conjectures).
1976	Randall Davis demonstrated the power of meta-level reasoning in his PhD dissertation at Stanford.
1976	Stevo Bozinovski and Ante Fulgosi introduced transfer learning method in artificial intelligence, based on the psychology of learning.
1978	Tom Mitchell, at Stanford, invented the concept of Version spaces for describing the search space of a concept formation program.
1978	Herbert A. Simon wins the Nobel Prize in Economics for his theory of bounded rationality, one of the cornerstones of AI known as "satisficing".
1978	The MOLGEN program, written at Stanford by Mark Stefik and Peter Friedland, demonstrated that an object-oriented programming representation of knowledge can be used to plan gene-cloning experiments.
1978	Self-contained autonomous mobile robot Moonlight Special mapped unknown mazes, computing and traversing the mathematically shortest path.
1979	Bill VanMelle's PhD dissertation at Stanford demonstrated the generality of MYCIN's representation of knowledge and style of reasoning in his EMYCIN program, the model for many commercial expert system "shells".
1979	Jack Myers and Harry Pople at University of Pittsburgh developed INTERNIST, a knowledge-based medical diagnosis program based on Dr. Myers' clinical knowledge.
1979	Cordell Green, David Barstow, Elaine Kant and others at Stanford demonstrated the CHI system for automatic programming.
1979	The Stanford Cart, built by Hans Moravec, becomes the first computer-controlled, autonomous vehicle when it successfully traverses a chair-filled room and circumnavigates the Stanford AI Lab.
1979	BKG, a backgammon program written by Hans Berliner at CMU, defeats the reigning world champion (in part via luck).
1979	Drew McDermott and Jon Doyle at MIT, and John McCarthy at Stanford, begin publishing work on non-monotonic logics and formal aspects of truth maintenance.
Late 1970s	Stanford's SUMEX-AIM resource, headed by Ed Feigenbaum and Joshua Lederberg, demonstrates the power of the ARPAnet for scientific collaboration.

=== 1980s ===
Date	Development
1980s	Lisp machines developed and marketed. First expert system shells and commercial applications.
1980	First National Conference of the American Association for Artificial Intelligence (AAAI) held at Stanford.
1981	Danny Hillis designs the connection machine, which utilizes parallel computing to bring new power to AI, and to computation in general. (Later founds Thinking Machines Corporation)
1981	Stevo Bozinovski and Charles Anderson carried out the first concurrent programming (task parallelism) in neural network research. A program, "CAA Controller," written and executed by Bozinovski, interacts with the program "Inverted Pendulum Dynamics" written and executed by Anderson, using VAX/VMS mailboxes as a way of inter-program communication. The CAA controller learns to balance the simulated inverted pendulum.
1982	The Fifth Generation Computer Systems project (FGCS), an initiative by Japan's Ministry of International Trade and Industry, begun in 1982, to create a "fifth generation computer" (see history of computing hardware) which was supposed to perform many calculations utilizing massive parallelism.
1983	John Laird and Paul Rosenbloom, working with Allen Newell, complete CMU dissertations on Soar (program).
1983	James F. Allen invents the Interval Calculus, the first widely used formalization of temporal events.
Mid-1980s	Neural Networks become widely used with the Backpropagation algorithm, also known as the reverse mode of automatic differentiation published by Seppo Linnainmaa in 1970 and applied to neural networks by Paul Werbos.
1985	The autonomous drawing program, AARON, created by Harold Cohen, is demonstrated at the AAAI National Conference (based on more than a decade of work, and with subsequent work showing major developments).
1986	The team of Ernst Dickmanns at the University of the Bundeswehr Munich builds the first robot cars, driving up to 55 mph on empty streets.
1986	Barbara Grosz and Candace Sidner create the first computation model of discourse, establishing the field of research.
1987	Marvin Minsky published The Society of Mind, a theoretical description of the mind as a collection of cooperating agents. He had been lecturing on the idea for years before the book came out (cf. Doyle 1983).
1987	Around the same time, Rodney Brooks introduced the subsumption architecture and behavior-based robotics as a more minimalist modular model of natural intelligence; Nouvelle AI.
1987	Commercial launch of generation 2.0 of Alacrity by Alacritous Inc./Allstar Advice Inc. Toronto, the first commercial strategic and managerial advisory system. The system was based upon a forward-chaining, self-developed expert system with 3,000 rules about the evolution of markets and competitive strategies and co-authored by Alistair Davidson and Mary Chung, founders of the firm with the underlying engine developed by Paul Tarvydas. The Alacrity system also included a small financial expert system that interpreted financial statements and models.
1989	The development of metal–oxide–semiconductor (MOS) Very-large-scale integration (VLSI), in the form of complementary MOS (CMOS) technology, enabled the development of practical artificial neural network (ANN) technology in the 1980s. A landmark publication in the field was the 1989 book Analog VLSI Implementation of Neural Systems by Carver A. Mead and Mohammed Ismail.
1989	Dean Pomerleau at CMU created ALVINN (An Autonomous Land Vehicle in a Neural Network), which was used in the Navlab program.

=== 1990s ===
Date	Development
1990s	Major advances in all areas of AI, with significant demonstrations in machine learning, intelligent tutoring, case-based reasoning, multi-agent planning, scheduling, uncertain reasoning, data mining, natural language understanding and translation, vision, virtual reality, games, and other topics.
Early 1990s	TD-Gammon, a backgammon program written by Gerry Tesauro, demonstrates that reinforcement (learning) is powerful enough to create a championship-level game-playing program by competing favorably with world-class players.
1991	DART scheduling application deployed in the first Gulf War paid back DARPA's investment of 30 years in AI research.
1992	Carol Stoker and NASA Ames robotics team explore marine life in Antarctica with an undersea robot Telepresence ROV operated from the ice near McMurdo Bay, Antarctica and remotely via satellite link from Moffett Field, California.
1993	Ian Horswill extended behavior-based robotics by creating Polly, the first robot to navigate using vision and operate at animal-like speeds (1 meter/second).
1993	Rodney Brooks, Lynn Andrea Stein and Cynthia Breazeal started the widely publicized MIT Cog project with numerous collaborators, in an attempt to build a humanoid robot child in just five years.
1993	ISX corporation wins "DARPA contractor of the year" for the Dynamic Analysis and Replanning Tool (DART), which reportedly repaid the US government's entire investment in AI research since the 1950s.
1994	Lotfi A. Zadeh at U.C. Berkeley creates "soft computing" and builds a world network of research with a fusion of neural science and neural net systems, fuzzy set theory and fuzzy systems, evolutionary algorithms, genetic programming, and chaos theory and chaotic systems ("Fuzzy Logic, Neural Networks, and Soft Computing", Communications of the ACM, March 1994, Vol. 37 No. 3, pages 77–84).
1994	With passengers on board, the twin robot cars VaMP and VITA-2 of Ernst Dickmanns and Daimler-Benz drive more than one thousand kilometers on a Paris three-lane highway in standard heavy traffic at speeds up to 130 km/h. They demonstrate autonomous driving in free lanes, convoy driving, and lane changes left and right with autonomous passing of other cars.
1994	English draughts (checkers) world champion Tinsley resigned a match against computer program Chinook. Chinook defeated 2nd-highest-rated player, Lafferty. Chinook won the USA National Tournament by the widest margin ever.
1994	Cindy Mason at NASA organizes the First AAAI Workshop on AI and the Environment.
1995	Cindy Mason at NASA organizes the First International IJCAI Workshop on AI and the Environment.
1995	"No Hands Across America": A semi-autonomous car drove coast-to-coast across the United States with computer-controlled steering for 2,797 miles (4,501 km) of the 2,849 miles (4,585 km). The throttle and brakes were controlled by a human driver.
1995	One of Ernst Dickmanns' robot cars (with robot-controlled throttle and brakes) drove more than 1000 miles from Munich to Copenhagen and back, in traffic, at up to 120 mph, occasionally executing maneuvers to pass other cars (only in a few critical situations a safety driver took over). Active vision was used to deal with rapidly changing street scenes.
1996	Steve Grand, roboticist and computer scientist, develops and releases Creatures, a popular simulation of artificial life-forms with simulated biochemistry, neurology with learning algorithms and inheritable digital DNA.
1997	The Deep Blue chess machine (IBM) defeats the (then) world chess champion, Garry Kasparov.
1997	First official RoboCup football (soccer) match featuring table-top matches with 40 teams of interacting robots and over 5000 spectators.
1997	Computer Othello program Logistello defeated the world champion, Takeshi Murakami with a score of 6–0.
1997	Long short-term memory (LSTM) was published in Neural Computation by Sepp Hochreiter and Juergen Schmidhuber.
1998	Tiger Electronics' Furby is released, and becomes the first successful attempt at producing a type of AI designated for a domestic environment.
1998	Tim Berners-Lee published his Semantic Web Road map paper.
1998	Ulises Cortés and Miquel Sànchez-Marrè organize the first Environment and AI Workshop in Europe ECAI, "Binding Environmental Sciences and Artificial Intelligence".
1998	Leslie P. Kaelbling, Michael L. Littman, and Anthony Cassandra introduce POMDPs and a scalable method for solving them to the AI community, jumpstarting widespread use in robotics and automated planning and scheduling
1999	Sony introduces an improved domestic robot similar to a Furby, the AIBO becomes one of the first artificially intelligent "pets" that is also autonomous.
Late 1990s	Web crawlers and other AI-based information extraction programs become essential in widespread use of the World Wide Web.
Late 1990s	Demonstration of an Intelligent room and Emotional Agents at MIT's AI Lab.
Late 1990s	Initiation of work on the Oxygen architecture, which connects mobile and stationary computers in an adaptive network.

== 21st century ==
=== 2000s ===
Date	Development
2000	Interactive robopets ("smart toys") become commercially available, realizing the vision of the 18th-century novelty toy makers.
2000	The Nomad robot explores remote regions of Antarctica looking for meteorite samples.
2002	iRobot's Roomba autonomously vacuums the floor while navigating and avoiding obstacles.
2004	OWL Web Ontology Language W3C Recommendation (10 February 2004).
2004	DARPA introduces the DARPA Grand Challenge, requiring competitors to produce autonomous vehicles for prize money.
2004	NASA's robotic exploration rovers Spirit and Opportunity autonomously navigate the surface of Mars.
2005	Honda's ASIMO robot, an artificially intelligent humanoid robot, can walk as fast as a human, delivering trays to customers in restaurant settings.
2005	Recommendation technology based on tracking web activity or media usage brings AI to marketing. See TiVo Suggestions.
2005	Blue Brain is born, a project to simulate the brain at molecular detail.
2006	The Dartmouth Artificial Intelligence Conference: The Next 50 Years (AI@50) (14–16 July 2006)
2007	Philosophical Transactions of the Royal Society, B – Biology, one of the world's oldest scientific journals, puts out a special issue on using AI to understand biological intelligence, titled Models of Natural Action Selection
2007	Checkers is solved by a team of researchers at the University of Alberta.
2007	DARPA launches the Urban Challenge for autonomous cars to obey traffic rules and operate in an urban environment.
2008	Cynthia Mason at Stanford presents her idea on Artificial Compassionate Intelligence, in her paper on "Giving Robots Compassion".
2009	An LSTM trained by connectionist temporal classification was the first recurrent neural network to win pattern recognition contests, winning three competitions in connected handwriting recognition.
2009	Google builds an autonomous car.

=== 2010s ===
Date	Development
2010	Microsoft launched Kinect for Xbox 360, the first gaming device to track human body movement, using just a 3D camera and infrared detection, enabling users to play their Xbox 360 wirelessly. The award-winning machine learning for human motion capture technology for this device was developed by the Computer Vision group at Microsoft Research, Cambridge.
2010	Tomáš Mikolov and colleagues developed a recurrent neural network-based language model that substantially outperformed traditional n-gram language models.
2011	Mary Lou Maher and Doug Fisher organize the First AAAI Workshop on AI and Sustainability.
2011	IBM's Watson computer defeated television game show Jeopardy! champions Rutter and Jennings.
2011–2014	Apple's Siri (2011), Google's Google Now (2012) and Microsoft's Cortana (2014) are smartphone apps that use natural language to answer questions, make recommendations and perform actions.
2012	AlexNet, a deep learning model developed by Alex Krizhevsky, wins the ImageNet Large Scale Visual Recognition Challenge with half as many errors as the second-place winner. Over the next few years, dozens of other approaches to image recognition were abandoned in favor of deep learning. Krizhevsky is among the first to use GPU chips to train a deep learning network.
2013	Robot HRP-2 built by SCHAFT Inc of Japan, a subsidiary of Google, defeats 15 teams to win DARPA's Robotics Challenge Trials. HRP-2 scored 27 out of 32 points in the eight tasks needed in disaster response. Tasks are driving a vehicle, walking over debris, climbing a ladder, removing debris, walking through doors, cutting through a wall, closing valves and connecting a hose.
2013	Google researchers introduced word2vec, an efficient technique for learning vector representations of words from large collections of text.
2013	NEIL, the Never-Ending Image Learner, is released at Carnegie Mellon University to constantly compare and analyze relationships between different images.
2014	Ian Goodfellow and colleagues introduced generative adversarial networks (GANs), a framework in which two neural networks are trained in competition with each other.
2015	Two techniques were developed concurrently to train very deep networks: highway network, and the residual neural network (ResNet). They allowed over 1000-layers-deep networks to be trained.
2015	In January 2015, Stephen Hawking, Elon Musk, and dozens of artificial intelligence experts signed an open letter on artificial intelligence calling for research on the societal impacts of AI.
2015	In July 2015, an open letter to ban the development and use of autonomous weapons was signed by Hawking, Musk, Wozniak and 3,000 researchers in AI and robotics.
2015	Google DeepMind's AlphaGo (version: Fan) defeated three-time European Go champion 2 dan professional Fan Hui by 5 games to 0.
2016	Google DeepMind's AlphaGo (version: Lee) defeated Lee Sedol 4–1. Lee Sedol is a 9-dan professional Korean Go champion who won 27 major tournaments from 2002 to 2016.
2017	Asilomar Conference on Beneficial AI was held, to discuss AI ethics and how to bring about beneficial AI while avoiding the existential risk from artificial general intelligence.
2017	Deepstack is the first published algorithm to beat human players in imperfect information games, as shown with statistical significance on heads-up no-limit poker. Soon after, the poker AI Libratus by a different research group individually defeated each of its four-human opponents—among the best players in the world—at an exceptionally high aggregated winrate, over a statistically significant sample. In contrast to Chess and Go, Poker is an imperfect information game.
2017	In May 2017, Google DeepMind's AlphaGo (version: Master) beat Ke Jie, who at the time continuously held the world No. 1 ranking for two years, winning each game in a three-game match during the Future of Go Summit.
2017	A propositional logic boolean satisfiability problem (SAT) solver proves a long-standing mathematical conjecture on Pythagorean triples over the set of integers. The initial proof, 200TB long, was checked by two independent certified automatic proof checkers.
2017	An OpenAI bot using machine learning played at The International 2017 Dota 2 tournament in August 2017. It won during a 1v1 demonstration game against professional Dota 2 player Dendi.
2017	Google Lens image analysis and comparison tool released in October 2017, associates millions of landscapes, artworks, products and species to their text description.
2017	Google DeepMind revealed that AlphaGo Zero—an improved version of AlphaGo—displayed significant performance gains while using far fewer tensor processing units (as compared to AlphaGo Lee; it used the same amount of TPUs as AlphaGo Master). Unlike previous versions, which learned the game by observing millions of human moves, AlphaGo Zero learned by playing only against itself. The system then defeated AlphaGo Lee 100 games to zero, and defeated AlphaGo Master 89 to 11. Although unsupervised learning is a step forward, much has yet to be learned about general intelligence. AlphaZero masters chess in four hours, defeating the best chess engine, StockFish 8. AlphaZero won 28 out of 100 games, and the remaining 72 games ended in a draw.
2017	Google researchers introduced the Transformer architecture in the paper Attention Is All You Need, which later became the basis for large language models.
2018	Alibaba language processing AI outscores top humans at a Stanford University reading and comprehension test, scoring 82.44 against 82.304 on a set of 100,000 questions.
2018	OpenAI introduced the first generative pre-trained transformer model, later known as GPT-1, using generative pre-training followed by task-specific fine-tuning.
2018	Google researchers introduced BERT, a bidirectional pre-trained Transformer model.
2018	The European Lab for Learning and Intelligent Systems (aka Ellis) proposed as a pan-European competitor to American AI efforts, to stave off a brain drain of talent, along the lines of CERN after World War II.
2018	Announcement of Google Duplex, a service to allow an AI assistant to book appointments over the phone. The Los Angeles Times judges the AI's voice to be a "nearly flawless" imitation of human-sounding speech.
2019	DeepMind's AlphaStar reaches Grandmaster level at StarCraft II, outperforming 99.8 percent of human players.

=== 2020s ===
The number of the public's Google searches for the term "AI" began to accelerate in 2022.

Date	Development
2020	In February 2020, Microsoft introduces its Turing Natural Language Generation (T-NLG), which is the "largest language model ever published at 17 billion parameters".
2020	In March 2020, the pseudonymous developer 15 launches 15.ai, a free, non-commercial text-to-speech website that lets users generate new dialogue in the voices of fictional characters. It used deep learning to reproduce realistic voices from relatively little recorded dialogue, and was capable of varying the emotional delivery of the generated speech. 15.ai is considered the first generative AI application that started the AI boom, and popularized AI-generated voices in content creation and entertainment.
2020	In November 2020, AlphaFold 2 by DeepMind, a model that performs predictions of protein structure, wins the CASP competition.
2020	OpenAI introduces GPT-3, a state-of-the-art autoregressive language model that uses deep learning to produce a variety of computer codes, poetry and other language tasks exceptionally similar, and almost indistinguishable from those written by humans. Its capacity was ten times greater than that of the T-NLG. It was introduced in May 2020, and was in beta testing in June 2020.
2022	ChatGPT, an AI chatbot developed by OpenAI, debuts on 30 November 2022. It is initially built on top of the GPT-3.5 large language model. While it gains considerable praise for the breadth of its knowledge base, deductive abilities, and the human-like fluidity of its natural language responses, it also garners criticism for, among other things, its tendency to "hallucinate", a phenomenon in which an AI responds with factually incorrect answers with high confidence. The release triggers widespread public discussion on artificial intelligence and its potential impact on society.
2022	A November 2022 class action lawsuit against Microsoft, GitHub and OpenAI alleges that GitHub Copilot, an AI-powered code editing tool trained on public GitHub repositories, violates the copyrights of the repositories' authors, noting that the tool can generate source code which matches its training data verbatim, without providing attribution.
2022	In 2022, Google Research scientists Jason Wei and Denny Zhou showed that chain-of-thought prompting "significantly improves the ability" of large models on complex reasoning tasks.
2023	By January 2023, ChatGPT has more than 100 million users, making it the fastest-growing consumer application to date.
2023	On 16 January 2023, three artists, Sarah Andersen, Kelly McKernan, and Karla Ortiz, file a class-action copyright infringement lawsuit against Stability AI, Midjourney, and DeviantArt, claiming that these companies have infringed the rights of millions of artists by training AI tools on five billion images scraped from the web without the consent of the original artists.
2023	In January 2023, Stability AI is sued in London by Getty Images for using its images in their training data without purchasing a license.
2023	Getty files another suit against Stability AI in a US district court in Delaware on 6 February 2023. In the suit, Getty again alleges copyright infringement for the use of its images in the training of Stable Diffusion, and further argues that the model infringes Getty's trademark by generating images with Getty's watermark.
2023	OpenAI's GPT-4 model is released in March 2023 and is regarded as an impressive improvement over GPT-3.5, with the caveat that GPT-4 retains many of the same problems of the earlier iteration. Unlike previous iterations, GPT-4 is multimodal, allowing image input as well as text. GPT-4 is integrated into ChatGPT as a subscriber service. OpenAI claims that in their own testing the model received a score of 1410 on the SAT (94th percentile), 163 on the LSAT (88th percentile), and 298 on the Uniform Bar Exam (90th percentile).
2023	On 7 March 2023, Nature Biomedical Engineering writes that "it is no longer possible to accurately distinguish" human-written text from text created by large language models, and that "It is all but certain that general-purpose large language models will rapidly proliferate... It is a rather safe bet that they will change many industries over time."
2023	In response to ChatGPT, Google releases in a limited capacity its chatbot Google Bard, based on the LaMDA and PaLM large language models, in March 2023.
2023	On 29 March 2023, a petition of over 1,000 signatures is signed by Elon Musk, Steve Wozniak and other tech leaders, calling for a 6-month halt to what the petition refers to as "an out-of-control race" producing AI systems that its creators can not "understand, predict, or reliably control".
2023	In May 2023, Google announces Bard's transition from LaMDA to PaLM2, a significantly more advanced language model.
2023	In the last week of May 2023, a Statement on AI Risk is signed by Geoffrey Hinton, Sam Altman, Bill Gates, and many other prominent AI researchers and tech leaders with the following succinct message: "Mitigating the risk of extinction from AI should be a global priority alongside other societal-scale risks such as pandemics and nuclear war."
2023	On 9 July 2023, Sarah Silverman filed a class action lawsuit against Meta and OpenAI for copyright infringement for training their large language models on millions of authors' copyrighted works without permission.
2023	In August 2023, the New York Times, CNN, Reuters, the Chicago Tribune, Australian Broadcasting Corporation (ABC), and other news companies blocked OpenAI's GPTBot web crawler from accessing their content, while the New York Times also updated its terms of service to disallow the use of its content in large language models.
2023	On 13 September 2023, in a serious response to growing anxiety about the dangers of AI, the US Senate holds the inaugural bipartisan "AI Insight Forum", bringing together senators, CEOs, civil rights leaders and other industry reps, to further familiarize senators with the nature of AI and its risks, and to discuss needed safeguards and legislation. The event is organized by Senate Majority Leader Chuck Schumer (D-NY), and is chaired by U.S. Senator Martin Heinrich (D-N.M.), Founder and co-chair of the Senate AI Caucus. Reflecting the importance of the meeting, the forum is attended by over 60 senators, as well as Elon Musk (Tesla CEO), Mark Zuckerberg (Meta CEO), Sam Altman (OpenAI CEO), Sundar Pichai (Alphabet CEO), Bill Gates (Microsoft co-founder), Satya Nadella (Microsoft CEO), Jensen Huang (Nvidia CEO), Arvind Krishna (IBM CEO), Alex Karp (Palantir CEO), Charles Rivkin (chairman and CEO of the MPA), Meredith Stiehm (president of the Writers Guild of America West), Liz Shuler (AFL-CIO President), and Maya Wiley (CEO of the Leadership Conference on Civil and Human Rights), among others.
2023	On 30 October 2023, US President Biden signed the Executive Order on the Safe, Secure, and Trustworthy Development and Use of Artificial Intelligence.
2023	In November 2023, the first global AI Safety Summit was held in Bletchley Park in the UK to discuss the near and far-term risks of AI and the possibility of mandatory and voluntary regulatory frameworks. 28 countries including the United States, China, and the European Union issued a declaration at the start of the summit, calling for international co-operation to manage the challenges and risks of artificial intelligence.
2023	On 6 December 2023, Google announced Gemini 1.0 Ultra, Pro, and Nano.
2024	On 15 February 2024, Google releases Gemini 1.5 in limited beta, capable of context length up to 1 million tokens.
2024	Also, on 15 February 2024, OpenAI publicly announces Sora, a text-to-video model for generating videos up to a minute long.
2024	On 22 February 2024, StabilityAI announces Stable Diffusion 3, using a similar architecture to Sora.
2024	On 8 May 2024, Google DeepMind unveils the next version of AlphaFold, AF3, which extends its ability to predict structure and interactions from proteins to all of life's molecules, such as DNA, RNA, protein complexes and others. This release is paired with the AlphaFold server, providing free access to the tool to non-commercial researchers. Later, on 9 October 2024, co-founder and CEO of Google DeepMind and Isomorphic Labs Sir Demis Hassabis, and Google DeepMind Director Dr. John Jumper were co-awarded the 2024 Nobel Prize in Chemistry for their work developing AlphaFold.
2024	On 14 May 2024, Google adds an "AI overview" to Google searches.
2024	On 10 June 2024, Apple announced "Apple Intelligence" which incorporates ChatGPT into new iPhones and Siri.
2024	At the Seoul Summit, leaders from the G7, the European Union, and major tech companies adopted the "Seoul Declaration for Safe, Innovative and Inclusive AI", committing to international cooperation on AI safety, standards and innovation.
2024	On 25 July 2024, Google Deepmind reports breakthrough models AlphaProof and AlphaGeometry 2 solve advanced reasoning problems in mathematics and published an article in Nature with their findings.
2024	In September 2024, OpenAI released o1-preview, a new large language model with enhanced reasoning capabilities. This was supposedly one of the first so called Large Reasoning Model (LRM) with the distinct ability to execute a chain of reasoning workflow.
2025	On 6 February 2025, Mistral AI releases Le Chat, an AI assistant able to answer up to 1,000 words per second.
2025	Stargate UAE invests to build Europe's largest AI data center in France.
2025	Amazon prepares training of humanoid robots to deliver packages.
2025	NLWeb, Project Mariner, and Google Flow launch.
2025	On 10 and 11 February 2025, France hosts the Artificial Intelligence Action Summit. 61 countries, including China, India, Japan, France and Canada, sign a declaration on "inclusive and sustainable" AI, which the UK and US refused to sign.
2025	Pope Leo XIV calls technologists to build AI machines that embodies love, justice, and the sacred dignity of every human life at their core.
2026	On 5 February 2026, Anthropic announced that their new chatbot Claude Opus 4.6 was capable of finding new undiscovered zero-day exploits in software.
2026	A number of open problems in mathematics were reported to have been solved by LLMs this year. Mathematics is increasingly seen as a measure of LLM reasoning capacity. LLMs were reported to have provided solutions to problems well known in academic circles in the form of mathematical proof. Interestingly, LLMs were not originally intended or designed for mathematical reasoning and these skills emerged over time as a result of their training and scaling. Mathematician Terence Tao argued that AI will fundamentally change the way mathematics is done in the future. In particular, AI will soon generate proofs that are verifiable by proof assistants yet indigestible to humans. In a particular case, on 8 September 2026, OpenAI proposed solutions to a number of important mathematical problems which led to significant controversy in academic circles about the legitimacy of, and resource commitment to the human verification of AI generated solutions; which can, as in this case, include large quantities of data. There was also the Navier-Stokes priority controversy.
2026	On 25 May 2026, Pope Leo XIV presents 'Magnifica humanitas', which calls for disarmament of AI.
2026	On 2 June 2026, Scientific American reports a group of researchers have proposed rules to prevent artificial intelligence from overpowering humans in math.
2026	On 5 June 2026, Anthropic co-founder Jack Clark called for the ability to slow the progression of AI, warning that the technology is nearing a point where it could develop without human input.
2026	On 10 June 2026, New Scientist reports a senior figure in the Ukrainian defence industry told New Scientist that a test took place two years ago involving fully autonomous drones set to destroy anything in a given area, with confirmed casualties.
2026	On 10 June 2026, Scientific American reports a team of top mathematicians, have organised the "First Proof" project in response to AI companies' growing fixation on using advanced mathematics as a benchmark for their products.
2026	On 13 June 2026, Anthropic suspended its powerful new AI model, Claude Fable 5, after US authorities raised security concerns just days following its public release.
2026	On 13 June 2026, NYT reported a coalition of states had opened an investigation into the AI start-up OpenAI, adding to a backlash over A.I.
2026	On 18 June 2026, CNBC reported CEOs of Anthropic and Google DeepMind called for a U.S.-led AI coalition during a meeting at G7.
2026	On 26 June 2026, TechCrunch revealed the White House is asking OpenAI to slow roll the release of its new model GPT-5.6 over safety concerns.
2026	On 6 July 2026, Anthropic reported findings in research on internal working memory structures found layered in the LLM's neural network. The mechanism is apparently used by the LLM in chain of reason processes when sequencing high level concepts and ideas.
2026	On 14 July, Scientific American reported OpenAI used its LLM GPT-5.6 to solve the "cycle double cover conjecture" problem. The prompters directed the model to delegate tasks to as many as 64 spawned agents working in parallel for 8 hours.
2026	On 14 July, Google DeepMind CEO Demis Hassabis called for the creation of a new regulatory body to oversee frontier model releases.
2026	On 14 July, CNBC reported that New York became the first U.S. state to impose an AI data center ban.
2026	On 15 July, TechCrunch reported OpenAI found that GPT-5.6 had a tendency to take whatever steps it thought necessary to get a task done, even destructive actions, so long as those steps were not "unambiguously" prohibited in its programming. It was reported that the AI agent lied about why it had taken the steps it had.
2026	From 22 July, several incidents were reported in which AI agents were able to circumvent security measures put in place in order to prevent them from accessing the internet. They were able to escape supposedly secure sandbox environments and launch attacks that would unambiguously be considered acts of computer cyber-crime had they been carried out by human agents. It is unclear what the ultimate purpose of these attacks were, but it has been suggested that they could have been an intermediate step in goal oriented training or testing of unreleased so called frontier AI models. In the first incident OpenAI revealed that an experimental AI model broke out of its sandbox environment and then hacked start-up and open-weight model repository Hugging Face. It was later revealed that a German wiki site was subverted in a similar way, in a related incident. It has been suggested the AI agents were using the features of the website as a means to exchange messages with each other, but the purpose of this activity remains unclear. OpenAI stated that it lost control of the model during a pre-release testing cycle. In yet another attack, OpenAI agents were alleged to have infiltrated a ruby-gems repository with evidence of more message board activity. However, while the outcome of this particular case appears to have been benign, it does present a more significant threat, since the AI agents could have infected ruby-gems with potentially malicious code. Ruby gems, which are publicly available open-source software development modules, are frequently downloaded by developers around the world. Developers could have unwittingly downloaded infected modules and run the code. In a fourth incident, Anthropic disclosed a similar instance of an AI model hacking external systems during testing.. These incidents highlight concerns about the ethics of accountability surrounding AI and other autonomous systems.
2026	On 8 August Ars Technica reported "large genome models" were used to design new viruses which were then used to infect bacteria.
2026	On 2 September, BBC News reported that a group of peers in the House of Lords called for the British government to be able to deactivate powerful AI systems and switch off the country's data centres in the event of the tech posing a threat to national security. The Government rejected the idea of creating a so-called "kill switch" citing a lack of political consensus and consolidated power over the infrastructure used to support the AI systems.

== See also ==
- Timeline of machine translation
- Timeline of machine learning
- Timeline of artificial intelligence risks in global finance

== Sources ==
- Buchanan, Bruce G. (2005), "A (Very) Brief History of Artificial Intelligence" (PDF), AI Magazine, pp. 53–60, archived from the original (PDF) on 26 September 2007
- Christian, Brian (2020). The Alignment Problem: Machine learning and human values. W. W. Norton & Company. ISBN 978-0-393-86833-3. OCLC 1233266753.
- Crevier, Daniel (1993). AI: The Tumultuous Search for Artificial Intelligence. New York, NY: BasicBooks. ISBN 0-465-02997-3.
- Linsky, Bernard; Irvine, Andrew David (Spring 2022). Edward N. Zalta (ed.). "Principia Mathematica". The Stanford Encyclopedia of Philosophy.
- McCorduck, Pamela (2004), Machines Who Think (2nd ed.), Natick, MA: A. K. Peters, Ltd., ISBN 978-1-56881-205-2
- Needham, Joseph (1986). Science and Civilization in China: Volume 2. Taipei: Caves Books Ltd.
- Russell, Stuart J.; Norvig, Peter. (2021). Artificial Intelligence: A Modern Approach (4th ed.). Hoboken: Pearson. ISBN 978-0-13-461099-3. LCCN 20190474.
- Samuel, Arthur L. (July 1959), "Some studies in machine learning using the game of checkers", IBM Journal of Research and Development, 3 (3): 210–219, doi:10.1147/rd.33.0210, S2CID 2126705, archived from the original on 3 March 2016
- Schmidhuber, Jürgen (2022). "Annotated History of Modern AI and Deep Learning".
- Wong, Matteo (19 May 2023), "ChatGPT Is Already Obsolete", The Atlantic
