= Action model learning =

Action model learning (sometimes abbreviated action learning) is an area of machine learning concerned with the creation and modification of a software agent's knowledge about the effects and preconditions of the actions that can be executed within its environment. This knowledge is usually represented in a logic-based action description language and used as input for automated planners.

Learning action models is important when goals change. When an agent acted for a while, it can use its accumulated knowledge about actions in the domain to make better decisions. Thus, learning action models differs from reinforcement learning. It enables reasoning about actions instead of expensive trials in the world. Action model learning is a form of inductive reasoning, where new knowledge is generated based on the agent's observations.

The usual motivation for action model learning is the fact that manual specification of action models for planners is often a difficult, time-consuming, and error-prone task (especially in complex environments).

== Action models ==
Given a training set $E$ consisting of examples $e = (s,a,s')$, where $s,s'$ are observations of a world state from two consecutive time steps $t, t'$ and $a$ is an action instance observed in time step $t$, the goal of action model learning in general is to construct an action model $\langle D,P \rangle$, where $D$ is a description of domain dynamics in action description formalism like STRIPS, ADL or PDDL and $P$ is a probability function defined over the elements of $D$. However, many state of the art action learning methods assume determinism and do not induce $P$. In addition to determinism, individual methods differ in how they deal with other attributes of domain (e.g. partial observability or sensoric noise).

== Action learning methods ==
=== State of the art ===
Recent action learning methods take various approaches and employ a wide variety of tools from different areas of artificial intelligence and computational logic. As an example of a method based on propositional logic, we can mention SLAF (Simultaneous Learning and Filtering) algorithm, which uses agent's observations to construct a long propositional formula over time and subsequently interprets it using a satisfiability (SAT) solver. Another technique, in which learning is converted into a satisfiability problem (weighted MAX-SAT in this case) and SAT solvers are used, is implemented in ARMS (Action-Relation Modeling System). Two mutually similar, fully declarative approaches to action learning were based on logic programming paradigm Answer Set Programming (ASP) and its extension, Reactive ASP. In another example, bottom-up inductive logic programming approach was employed. Several different solutions are not directly logic-based. For example, the action model learning using a perceptron algorithm or the multi level greedy search over the space of possible action models. In the older paper from 1992, the action model learning was studied as an extension of reinforcement learning.

Nonetheless, further algorithms can be found that operate under different assumptions: FAMA can work even when some observations are missing, and it produces a general (lifted) planning model. It treats learning an action model like a planning problem, making sure the learned model matches the observations given. NOLAM can learn general action models even from noisy or imperfect data. LOCM focuses only on the order of actions in the data, ignoring any details about the states between those actions. The family of safe action model (SAM) learning methods create models that guarantee any plans made with them will actually work in the real world. There's also an extension called N-SAM that can learn action models with numeric conditions and effects.

Additionally, numeric action models like N-SAM can be used to improve reinforcement learning (RL) performance through the RAMP algorithm.

=== Literature ===
Most action learning research papers are published in journals and conferences focused on artificial intelligence in general (e.g. Journal of Artificial Intelligence Research (JAIR), Artificial Intelligence, Applied Artificial Intelligence (AAI) or AAAI conferences). Despite mutual relevance of the topics, action model learning is usually not addressed in planning conferences like the International Conference on Automated Planning and Scheduling (ICAPS).

== See also ==
- Machine learning
- Automated planning and scheduling
- Action language
- PDDL
- Architecture description language
- Inductive reasoning
- Computational logic
- Knowledge representation
