= Drew McDermott =

American computer scientist (1949–2022)

Drew Vincent McDermott
- Born: December 27, 1949
- Died: May 26, 2022 (aged 72)
- Education: MIT (BS, MS, PhD)
- Known for: PDDL
- Awards: AAAI Fellow
- Scientific career
- Fields: Artificial Intelligence; Computer Science
- Thesis: Flexibility and Efficiency in a Computer Program for Designing Circuits (1977)
- Doctoral advisor: Gerald Jay Sussman
- Doctoral students: Yoav Shoham; Thomas Dean
- Website: www.cs.yale.edu/homes/dvm/

Drew McDermott (December 27, 1949 – May 26, 2022) was a professor of computer science at Yale University. He was known for his contributions in artificial intelligence and automated planning.

== Education ==
Drew McDermott earned B.S., M.S., and Ph.D. degrees from the Massachusetts Institute of Technology (MIT).

He became a tenured full professor at Yale in 1983. He served as chair of the department from 1991 to 1995. He retired in 2018.

== Research ==
McDermott's research was in the area of artificial intelligence, with side excursions into philosophy. His Ph.D. dissertation was in the area of automated planning. In that work, he coined the term "task network" to refer to hierarchies of abstract and concrete actions and policies.

McDermott did seminal work in non-monotonic logic in the early 1980s and was an advocate for the "logicist" methodology in AI, defined as formalizing knowledge and reasoning in terms of deduction and quasideduction. In 1987, he published a paper criticizing the logicist approach. The critique was based partly on a previous paper (with Steve Hanks) pointing out a flaw with all known approaches to nonmonotonic temporal reasoning, embodied in what is now called the Yale shooting problem.

== Artificial intelligence ==
Although new approaches have since been found, McDermott turned to other areas of AI, such as vision and robotics, and began working on automated planning again. His work on planning focused on the "classical" case rather than on hierarchical task network planning. In 1990 he was named a Fellow of the Association for the Advancement of Artificial Intelligence, one of the first group of Fellows.

In 1996, McDermott (and Hector Geffner and Blai Bonet independently) discovered "estimated-regression planning," based on the idea of heuristic search with an estimator derived from a simplified domain model by reasoning backward ("regression") from the goal. The simplified version is obtained automatically from a full domain model by ignoring propositions deleted by actions.

In 2000, McDermott got interested in logic again because the development of the semantic web made it seem newly applicable. He did work on ontology translation and on semantic web services.

== ICAPS ==
McDermott was a prime mover, with James Hendler and others, behind the AI Planning Systems Conference, which, after merging with the European Conference on Planning, became the annual International Conference on Automated Planning and Scheduling (ICAPS). He also helped start the International Planning Competition, which is held semiannually in conjunction with ICAPS. He led the group that molded the Planning Domain Definition Language from several predecessor notations in order to provide a standard notation for input to planning systems.

A sideline of McDermott's work has been an interest in the philosophy of mind, stemming from his realization as a child that "electronic brains" do not have a "part that thinks", and that therefore biological brains probably don't either. This interest culminated in the publication in 2001 of a book on computational models of consciousness.

== Personal life ==
McDermott was married in 1975, divorced in 1997, and remarried the same year. He has two children from his first marriage. He and his second wife, Judy Nugent, lived in New Haven, Connecticut from 1999 until his death.

== Publications ==
- Eugene Charniak, Christopher Riesbeck, and Drew McDermott (1980) Artificial Intelligence Programming. Lawrence Erlbaum Associates.
- Eugene Charniak and Drew McDermott (1985) Introduction to Artificial Intelligence. Reading, Mass.: Addison-Wesley.
- Steven Hanks and Drew McDermott (1987) Nonmonotonic logic and temporal projection. Artificial Intelligence 33, no.3, pp. 379–412
- Drew McDermott (1987) A critique of pure reason. Computational Intelligence 3(33), pp. 151–160.
- Drew McDermott (1996) A Heuristic Estimator for Means-Ends Analysis in Planning. In Proc. International Conference on AI Planning Systems 3, pp. 142–149
- Drew McDermott (ed.) 1998 The Planning Domain Definition Language Manual. Yale Computer Science Report 1165 (CVC Report 98-003). Available at .
- Drew McDermott (1999) Using Regression-Match Graphs to Control Search in Planning. Artificial Intelligence 109(1–2), pp. 111–159
- Drew McDermott. (2001) Mind and Mechanism. Cambridge, Mass.: MIT Press. ISBN 978-0-262-13392-0
