= Hector Geffner =

Argentinian computer scientist and AI researcher

- Education: University of California, Los Angeles
- Awards: Alexander von Humboldt Professorship (2023) EurAI Fellow ICAPS Influential Paper Award (2014, 2010, 2009) ACM Doctoral Dissertation Award (1990)
- Scientific career
- Fields: Artificial Intelligence Computer Science Automated Planning
- Workplaces: RWTH Aachen University
- Thesis: Default Reasoning: Casual and Conditional Theories (1989)
- Doctoral advisor: Judea Pearl

Hector Geffner is an Argentinian computer scientist and a Alexander von Humboldt Professor of artificial intelligence at RWTH Aachen University and Wallenberg Guest Professor in AI at Linköping University. His research interests are focused on artificial intelligence, especially automated planning and the integration of model-based AI and data-based AI. He is best known for his work on domain-independent heuristic planning and received several International Conference on Automated Planning and Scheduling (ICAPS) influential paper awards. Previously he held a research professorship at ICREA and the Artificial Intelligence and Machine Learning Group at University Pompeu Fabra in Barcelona since 2001. He was a staff researcher at the IBM Thomas J. Watson Research Center from 1990 to 1992 and a professor at Simón Bolívar University in Caracas, Venezuela from 1992 to 2001. Geffner was awarded an ERC Advanced Grant in 2020 to explore the connection between machine learning and model-based AI, and is a former board member and current fellow of the European Association for Artificial Intelligence (EurAI). He was elected an AAAI Fellow in 2007.

Geffner received his PhD in computer science at the University of California, Los Angeles in 1989 under the supervision of Judea Pearl on the topic Default Reasoning: Casual and Conditional Theories, for which he received an ACM Doctoral Dissertation Award.
