= Taems =

Taems or TAEMS or TÆMS may refer to:

- Atreyee D. A. V. Public School, a school in India
- Task analysis environment modeling simulation (computer science), a multi-agent task modeling language
- Terminal Area Energy Management, a guidance system used in the final phase of a Space Shuttle landing (referred to as the TAEMs).

== See also ==
- Pha Taem
- Taema
- Taemado
