= CDPS =

CDPS may refer to:

- Cirencester Deer Park School
- Cooperative distributed problem solving
