= State-space search =

Class of search algorithms

State-space search is a process used in the field of computer science, including artificial intelligence (AI), in which successive configurations or states of an instance are considered, with the intention of finding a goal state with the desired property.

Problems are often modelled as a state space, a set of states that a problem can be in. The set of states forms a graph where two states are connected if there is an operation that can be performed to transform the first state into the second.

State-space search often differs from traditional computer science search methods because the state space is implicit: the typical state-space graph is much too large to generate and store in memory. Instead, nodes are generated as they are explored, and typically discarded thereafter. A solution to a combinatorial search instance may consist of the goal state itself, or of a path from some initial state to the goal state.

== Representation ==
In state-space search, a state space is formally represented as a tuple $S: \langle S, A, \operatorname{Action}(s), \operatorname{Result}(s,a), \operatorname{Cost}(s,a) \rangle$, in which:

- $S$ is the set of all possible states;
- $A$ is the set of possible actions, not related to a particular state but regarding all the state space;
- $\operatorname{Action}(s)$ is the function that establishes which action is possible to perform in a certain state;
- $\operatorname{Result}(s,a)$ is the function that returns the state reached performing action $a$ in state $s$;
- $\operatorname{Cost}(s,a)$ is the cost of performing an action $a$ in state $s$. In many state spaces, $a$ is a constant, but this is not always true.

== Examples of state-space search algorithms ==
=== Uninformed search ===
According to Poole and Mackworth, the following are uninformed state-space search methods, meaning that they do not have any prior information about the goal's location.

- Traditional depth-first search
- Breadth-first search
- Iterative deepening
- Lowest-cost-first search / Uniform-cost search (UCS)

=== Informed search ===
These methods take the goal's location in the form of a heuristic function. Poole and Mackworth cite the following examples as informed search algorithms:

- Informed/Heuristic depth-first search
- Greedy best-first search
- A* search

== See also ==
- State space
- State-space planning
- Branch and bound – Method for making state-space search more efficient by pruning subsets of it
