= Meredith Ringel Morris =

American computer scientist

- Citizenship: United States
- Education: Brown University (BS); Stanford University (MS, PhD)
- Awards: TR35, CHI Academy, ACM Fellow
- Scientific career
- Fields: human–computer interaction, accessibility, information retrieval, AI
- Workplaces: Microsoft Research, University of Washington, Google Brain, Google DeepMind
- Doctoral advisor: Terry Winograd
- Website: https://cs.stanford.edu/~merrie/

Meredith Ringel Morris is an American computer scientist whose contributions span HCI (human–computer interaction) and AI (artificial intelligence) research, including contributions in gesture interaction design, computer-supported cooperative work, information retrieval, accessible technologies and human-centered AI. She is a principal scientist and director at Google DeepMind (and was previously Director of the People + AI Research team in Google Research's Responsible AI division) and an affiliate professor at the University of Washington in The Paul G. Allen School of Computer Science & Engineering and in The Information School.

Prior to joining Google, she was Research Area Manager for Interaction, Accessibility, and Mixed Reality at Microsoft Research, where she founded the Ability team. Morris’ expertise in accessible technologies served as a bridge to her transition from an HCI researcher to an AI researcher, beginning with a focus on issues such as how AI tools could extend the capabilities of people with vision, hearing, motor, and cognitive disabilities as well as considerations of related ethics and fairness concerns, such as the inclusion (or lack thereof) of people with disabilities and older adults in AI training data.

== Early life and education ==
Morris earned her Bachelor of Science (B.S.) in computer science from Brown University, magna cum laude, where her undergraduate research was advised by Andy van Dam. She earned her M.S. and Ph.D. in computer science from Stanford University, where she was advised by Terry Winograd. Her high school didn't offer computer science coursework, but she was inspired to study computer science after attending the Pennsylvania Governor's School for the Sciences, a summer magnet program at Carnegie Mellon University for high school students residing in Pennsylvania.

== Recognition ==
- ACM Fellow
- ACM SIGCHI CHI Academy
- ACM Distinguished Members
- TR35 Award
- UIST Lasting Impact Award
