= SHRDLU =

Computer program for understanding natural language

- Original author: Terry Winograd
- Release: 1967
- Written in: Micro Planner, Lisp
- Operating system: PDP-6
- Platform: DEC
- Type: natural-language understanding

SHRDLU is an early natural-language understanding computer program that was developed by Terry Winograd at MIT in 1968–1970. In the program, the user carries on a conversation with the computer, moving objects, naming collections and querying the state of a simplified "blocks world", essentially a virtual box filled with different blocks.

SHRDLU was written in the Micro Planner and Lisp on the DEC PDP-6 computer and a DEC graphics terminal. Later additions were made at the computer graphics labs at the University of Utah, adding a full 3D rendering of SHRDLU's "world".

The name SHRDLU was derived from ETAOIN SHRDLU, the arrangement of the letter keys on a Linotype machine, arranged in descending order of usage frequency in English.

== Functionality ==
SHRDLU is primarily a language parser that allows user interaction using English terms. The user instructs SHRDLU to move various objects around in the "blocks world" containing various basic objects such as blocks, cones and balls. SHRDLU combined four simple ideas to make the simulation of "understanding" more convincing.

One was that SHRDLU's world is so simple that the entire set of objects and locations could be described by including as few as 50 words: nouns like "block" and "cone", verbs like "place on" and "move to", and adjectives like "big" and "blue". The possible combinations of these basic language building blocks are quite simple.

SHRDLU also includes a basic memory to supply context. One could ask SHRDLU to "put the green cone on the red block" and then "take the cone off"; "the cone" would be taken to mean the green cone one had just talked about. SHRDLU can search back further through the interactions to find the proper context in most cases when additional adjectives were supplied. One could also ask questions about the history; for instance, one could ask "did you pick up anything before the cone?"

A side effect of this memory, and the original rules SHRDLU was supplied with, is that the program can answer questions about what was possible in the world and what was not. For instance, SHRDLU can deduce that blocks could be stacked by looking for examples, but also realize that triangles could not be stacked, after having tried it. The "world" contains basic physics to make blocks fall over, independent of the language parser.

Finally, SHRDLU can also remember names given to objects, or arrangements of them. For instance one could say "a steeple is a small triangle on top of a tall rectangle"; SHRDLU can then answer questions about steeples in the blocks world, and build new ones.

This is an example of a SHRDLU session:

Person: Pick up a big red block.
Computer: OK.
Person: Grasp the pyramid.
Computer: I DON'T UNDERSTAND WHICH PYRAMID YOU MEAN.
Person (changing their mind): Find a block which is taller than the one you are holding and put it into the box.
Computer: BY "IT", I ASSUME YOU MEAN THE BLOCK WHICH IS TALLER THAN THE ONE I AM HOLDING.
Computer: OK.
Person: What does the box contain?
Computer: THE BLUE PYRAMID AND THE BLUE BLOCK.
Person: What is the pyramid supported by?
Computer: THE BOX.
Person: How many blocks are not in the box?
Computer: FOUR OF THEM.
Person: Is at least one of them narrower than the one which i told you to pick up?
Computer: YES, THE RED CUBE.
Person: Is it supported?
Computer: YES, BY THE TABLE.
Person: Can the table pick up blocks?
Computer: NO.
Person: Can a pyramid be supported by a block?
Computer: YES.
Person: Can a pyramid support a pyramid?
Computer: I DON'T KNOW.
Person: Stack up two pyramids.
Computer: I CAN'T.
Person: Will you please stack up both of the red blocks and either a green cube or a pyramid?
Computer: OK.
Person: Which cube is sitting on the table?
Computer: THE LARGE GREEN ONE WHICH SUPPORTS THE RED PYRAMID.
Person: Is there a large block behind a pyramid?
Computer: YES, THREE OF THEM: A LARGE RED ONE, A LARGE GREEN CUBE, AND THE BLUE ONE.
Person: Put a small one onto the green cube which supports a pyramid.
Computer: OK.
Person: Put the littlest pyramid on top of it.
Computer: OK.
Person: Does the shortest thing the tallest pyramid's support supports support anything green?
Computer: YES, THE GREEN PYRAMID.
Person: What color is it?
Computer: BY "IT", I ASSUME YOU MEAN THE SHORTEST THING THE TALLEST PYRAMID'S SUPPORT SUPPORTS.
Computer: RED
Person: How many things are on top of green cubes?
Computer: I'M NOT SURE WHAT YOU MEAN BY "ON TOP OF" IN THE PHRASE "ON TOP OF GREEN CUBES" .
DO YOU MEAN:
1 - DIRECTLY ON THE SURFACE
2 - ANWHERE ON TOP OF ?
Person: 2
Computer: THREE OF THEM.
Person: Had you touched any pyramid before you put the green one on the little cube?
Computer: YES, THE GREEN ONE.
Person: When did you pick it up?
Computer: WHILE I WAS STACKING UP THE RED CUBE, A LARGE RED BLOCK AND A LARGE GREEN CUBE.
Person: Why?
Computer: TO GET RID OF IT.
Person: Why did you do that?
Computer: TO CLEAN OFF THE RED CUBE.
Person: Why did you clear off that cube?
Computer: TO PUT IT ON A LARGE GREEN CUBE.
Person: Why did you do that?
Computer: TO STACK UP THE RED CUBE , A LARGE RED BLOCK AND A LARGE GREEN CUBE.
Person: Why did you do that?
Computer: BECAUSE YOU ASKED ME TO.
Person: How did you do it?
Computer: BY PUTTING A LARGE RED BLOCK ON THE TABLE ; THEN LETTING GO OF IT ; THEN PUTTING A LARGE GREEN CUBE ON IT ; THEN LETTING GO OF THAT CUBE ; THEN PUTTING THE RED CUBE ON THAT CUBE; THEN LETTING GO OF THAT CUBE.
Person: How many objects did you touch while you were doing it?
Computer: FOUR OF THEM.
Person: What did the red cube support before you started to clean it off?
Computer: THE GREEN PYRAMID.
Person: There were five blocks to the left of the box then.
Computer: NO, ONLY FOUR OF THEM: THE RED CUBE, TWO LARGE GREEN CUBES AND A LARGE RED BLOCK.
Person: Put the blue pyramid on the block in the box.
Computer: OK.
Person: Is there anything which is bigger than every pyramid but is not as wide as the thing that supports it?
Computer: YES, THE BLUE BLOCK.
Person: Does a steeple
Computer (interrupting): SORRY, I DON'T KNOW THE WORD "STEEPLE".
Person: A "steeple" is a stack which contains two green cubes and a pyramid.
Computer: I UNDERSTAND.
Person: Are there any steeples now?
Computer: NO.
Person: Build one.
Computer: OK.
Person: Call the biggest block "superblock".
Computer: OK.
Person: Have you picked superblock up since we began?
Computer: YES.
Person: Why did you drop it?
Computer: BY "IT", I ASSUME YOU MEAN THE SUPERBLOCK.
I CAN'T EXPLAIN A NON-EXISTENT EVENT.
Person: Is there anything to the right of the red pyramid?
Computer: YES, FOUR THINGS: THE BOX, THE RED CUBE, THE BLUE PYRAMID AND THE BLOCK NAMED SUPERBLOCK
Person: Thank you.
Computer: YOU'RE WELCOME!

== Consequences ==
SHRDLU was considered a tremendously successful demonstration of artificial intelligence (AI). This led other AI researchers to excessive optimism which was soon lost when later systems attempted to deal with situations with a more realistic level of ambiguity and complexity. Subsequent efforts of the SHRDLU type, such as Cyc, have tended to focus on providing the program with considerably more information from which it can draw conclusions.

In a 1991 interview, Winograd said about SHRDLU:

[...] the famous dialogue with SHRDLU where you could pick up a block, and so on, I very carefully worked through, line by line. If you sat down in front of it, and asked it a question that wasn't in the dialogue, there was some probability it would answer it. I mean, if it was reasonably close to one of the questions that was there in form and in content, it would probably get it. But there was no attempt to get it to the point where you could actually hand it to somebody and they could use it to move blocks around. And there was no pressure for that whatsoever. Pressure was for something you could demo. Take a recent example, Negroponte's Media Lab, where instead of "perish or publish" it's "demo or die." I think that's a problem. I think AI suffered from that a lot, because it led to "Potemkin villages", things which - for the things they actually did in the demo looked good, but when you looked behind that there wasn't enough structure to make it really work more generally.

Though not intentionally developed as such, SHRDLU is considered the first known formal example of interactive fiction, as the user interacts with simple commands to move objects around a virtual environment, though lacking the distinct story-telling normally present in the interactive fiction genre. The 1976–1977 game Colossal Cave Adventure is broadly considered to be the first true work of interactive fiction.

== See also ==
- Planner (programming language)
