= International Conference on Automated Planning and Scheduling =

Artificial intelligence conference

- Abbreviation: ICAPS
- Discipline: automated planning and scheduling, artificial intelligence

Publication details
- History: 1990–present
- Frequency: Annual
- Open access: yes (https://dblp.org/db/conf/icaps/index.html and https://ojs.aaai.org/index.php/ICAPS/issue/archive)
- Website: https://www.icaps-conference.org/

The International Conference on Automated Planning and Scheduling (ICAPS) is a leading international academic conference in automated planning and scheduling held annually for researchers and practitioners in planning and scheduling. ICAPS is supported by the National Science Foundation, the journal Artificial Intelligence, and other supporters.

== The IPC and PDDL ==
ICAPS conducts the International Planning Competition (IPC), a competition scheduled every few years that empirically evaluates state-of-the-art planning systems on a collection of benchmark problems. The Planning Domain Definition Language (PDDL) was developed mainly to make the 1998/2000 International Planning Competition possible, and then evolved with each competition. PDDL is an attempt to standardize Artificial Intelligence (AI) planning languages. PDDL was first developed by Drew McDermott and his colleagues in 1998, inspired by STRIPS, ADL, and other sources.

== History ==
The ICAPS conferences began in 2003 as a merge of two bi-annual conferences, the International Conference on Artificial Intelligence Planning and Scheduling (AIPS) and the European Conference on Planning (ECP).

== List of events ==
Year	Date held	Name	Location	Ref.
1990		EPS	Brighton, United Kingdom	
1991		EWSP	Sankt Augustin, Germany	
1992		AIPS	College Park, MD, United States	
1993		EWSP	Vadstena, Sweden	
1994		AIPS	(United States) Chicago, IL, USA	
1995		EWSP	Assisi, Italy	
1996		AIPS	Edinburgh, United Kingdom	
1997		ECP	Toulouse, France	
1998		AIPS	Pittsburgh, PA, United States	
1999		ECP	Durham, United Kingdom	
2000		AIPS	Breckenridge, CO, United States	
2001	12–14 September	ECP	Toledo, Spain	
2002	23–27 April	AIPS	Toulouse, France	
2003	9–13 June	ICAPS	Trento, Italy	
2004	3–7 June	ICAPS	Whistler, Canada	
2005	5–10 June	ICAPS	Monterey, CA, United States	
2006	6–10 June	ICAPS	Lake District, United Kingdom	
2007	22–26 September	ICAPS	Providence, RI, United States	
2008	14–18 September	ICAPS	Sydney, Australia	
2009	19–23 September	ICAPS	Thessaloniki, Greece	
2010	12–16 May	ICAPS	Toronto, Canada	
2011	11–16 June	ICAPS	Freiburg, Germany	
2012	25–29 June	ICAPS	Atibaia, São Paulo, Brazil	
2013	10–14 June	ICAPS	Rome, Italy	
2014	21–26 June	ICAPS	Portsmouth, VA, United States	
2015	7–11 June	ICAPS	Jerusalem, Israel	
2016	12–17 June	ICAPS	London, United Kingdom	
2017	18–23 June	ICAPS	Pittsburgh, PA, United States	
2018	24–29 October	ICAPS	Delft, The Netherlands	
2019	11–15 July	ICAPS	(United States) Berkeley, CA, USA	
2020	26–30 October	ICAPS	Nancy, France – Virtual Conference	
2021	2–13 August	ICAPS	Guangzhou, China – Virtual Conference	
2022	13–24 June	ICAPS	Singapore – Virtual Conference	
2023	8–13 July	ICAPS	Prague, Czech Republic	
2024	1–6 June	ICAPS	Banff, Canada	
