= Toy problem =

Simplified example problem used for research or exposition

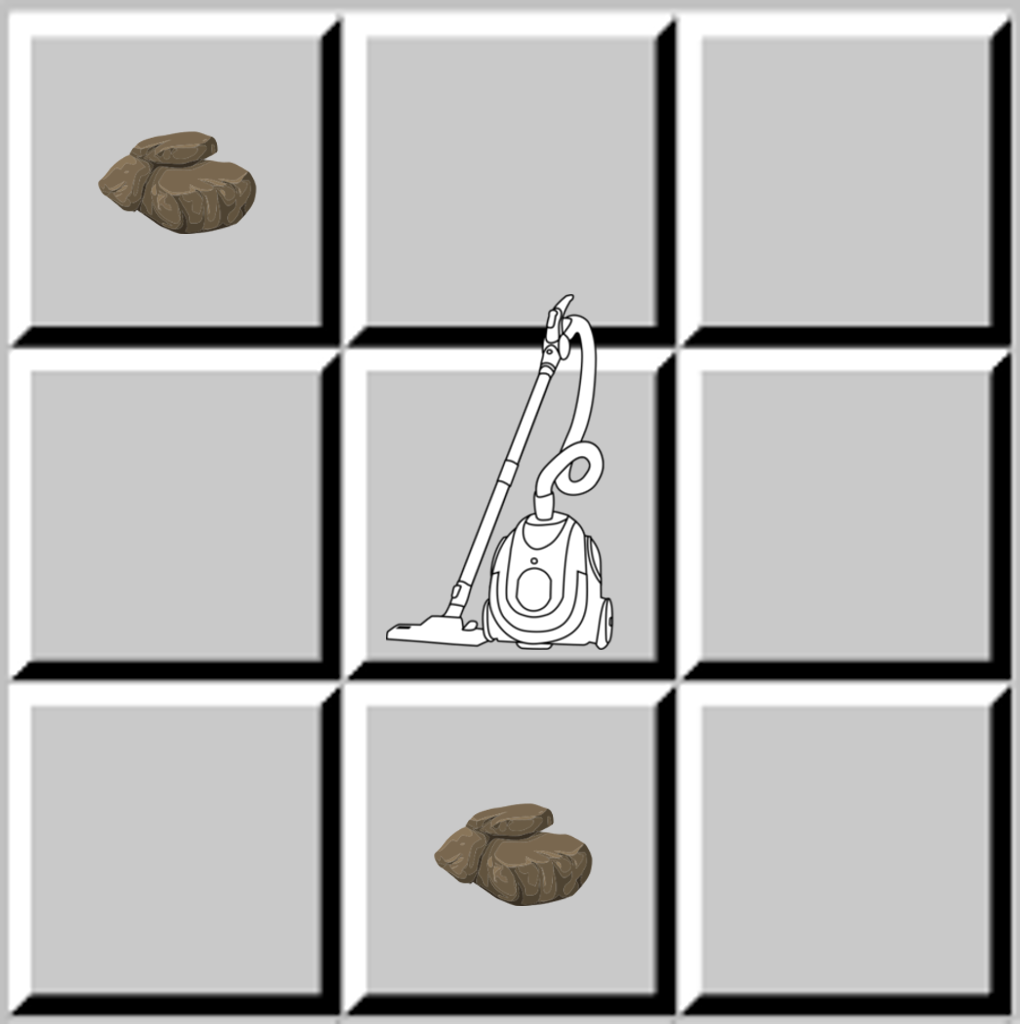
Vacuum World, a shortest path problem in which the goal is to vacuum up all the pieces of dirt

In scientific disciplines, a toy problem or a puzzlelike problem is a problem that is not of immediate scientific interest, yet is used as an expository device to illustrate a trait that may be shared by other, more complicated, instances of the problem, or as a way to explain a particular, more general, problem solving technique. A toy problem is useful to test and demonstrate methodologies. Researchers can use toy problems to compare the performance of different algorithms. They are also good for game designing.

For instance, while engineering a large system, the large problem is often broken down into many smaller toy problems which have been well understood in detail. Often these problems distill a few important aspects of complicated problems so that they can be studied in isolation. Toy problems are thus often very useful in providing intuition about specific phenomena in more complicated problems.

As an example, in the field of artificial intelligence, classical puzzles, games and problems are often used as toy problems. These include sliding-block puzzles, N-Queens problem, missionaries and cannibals problem, tic-tac-toe, chess, Tower of Hanoi and others.

== See also ==
- Blocks world
- Firing squad synchronization problem
- Monkey and banana problem
- Secretary problem
