= Monkey and banana problem =

Thought experiment

The monkey and banana problem is a famous toy problem in artificial intelligence, particularly in logic programming and planning. It has been framed as:

A monkey is in a room containing a box and a bunch of bananas. The bananas are hanging from the ceiling out of reach of the monkey. How can the monkey obtain the bananas?

The situation is used as a toy problem for computer science and can be solved with an expert system such as CLIPS. The example set of rules that CLIPS provides is somewhat fragile, in that, naive changes to the rulebase that might seem to a human of average intelligence to make common sense can cause the engine to fail to get the monkey to reach the banana.

Other examples exist using Rules Based System (RBS), including a project implemented in Python.

== See also ==
- Tool use by non-humans
