= Cooperative distributed problem solving =

In computing cooperative distributed problem solving is a network of semi-autonomous processing nodes working together to solve a problem, typically in a multi-agent system. That is concerned with the investigation of problem subdivision, sub-problem distribution, results synthesis, optimisation of problem solver coherence and co-ordination. It is closely related to distributed constraint programming and distributed constraint optimization; see the links below.

== Aspects of CDPS ==
- Neither global control or global data storage – no individual CDPS problem solver (agent) has sufficient information to solve the entire problem.
- Control and data are distributed
- Communication is slower than computation, therefore:
  - Loose coupling between problem solvers
  - Efficient protocols (not too much communication overhead)
  - problems should be modular, coarse grained
- Any unique node is a potential bottleneck
  - Organised behaviour is hard to guarantee since no one node has the complete picture

== See also ==
- Multiscale decision making
- Distributed constraint optimization
- Distributed artificial intelligence
- Multi-agent planning

== Some relevant books ==
- Faltings, Boi (2006). "Distributed Constraint Programming". In Rossi, Francesca; van Beek, Peter; Walsh, Toby (eds.). Handbook of Constraint Programming. Elsevier. ISBN 978-0-444-52726-4. Archived from the original on 2012-10-04. A chapter in an edited book.
- Meisels, Amnon (2008). Distributed Search by Constrained Agents. Springer. ISBN 978-1-84800-040-7.
- Shoham, Yoav; Leyton-Brown, Kevin (2009). Multiagent Systems: Algorithmic, Game-Theoretic, and Logical Foundations. New York: Cambridge University Press. ISBN 978-0-521-89943-7. See Chapters 1 and 2; downloadable free online.
- Yokoo, Makoto (2001). Distributed constraint satisfaction: Foundations of cooperation in multi-agent systems. Springer. ISBN 978-3-540-67596-9.
