= Autonomous robot =

Robot that performs behaviors or tasks with a high degree of autonomy

An autonomous robot is a robot that acts without recourse to human control. Historic examples include space probes. Modern examples include self-driving vacuums and cars.

Industrial robot arms that work on assembly lines inside factories may also be considered autonomous robots, though their autonomy is restricted due to a highly structured environment and their inability to locomote.

== Components and criteria of robotic autonomy ==
=== Self-maintenance ===
The first requirement for complete physical autonomy is the ability for a robot to take care of itself. Many of the battery-powered robots on the market today can find and connect to a charging station, and some toys like Sony's Aibo are capable of self-docking to charge their batteries.

Self-maintenance is based on "proprioception", or sensing one's own internal status. In the battery charging example, the robot can tell proprioceptively that its batteries are low, and it then seeks the charger. Another common proprioceptive sensor is for heat monitoring. Increased proprioception will be required for robots to work autonomously near people and in harsh environments. Common proprioceptive sensors include thermal, optical, and haptic sensing, as well as the Hall effect (electric).

Robot GUI display showing battery voltage and other proprioceptive data in lower right-hand corner. The display is for user information only. Autonomous robots monitor and respond to proprioceptive sensors without human intervention to keep themselves safe and operating properly.

=== Sensing the environment ===
Exteroception is sensing things about the environment. Autonomous robots must have a range of environmental sensors to perform their task and stay out of trouble. The autonomous robot can recognize sensor failures and minimize the impact on the performance caused by failures.

- Common exteroceptive sensors include the electromagnetic spectrum, sound, touch, chemical (smell, odor), temperature, range to various objects, and altitude.

Some robotic lawn mowers will adapt their programming by detecting the speed in which grass grows as needed to maintain a perfectly cut lawn, and some vacuum cleaning robots have dirt detectors that sense how much dirt is being picked up and use this information to tell them to stay in one area longer.

=== Task performance ===
The next step in autonomous behavior is to actually perform a physical task. A new area showing commercial promise is domestic robots, with a flood of small vacuuming robots beginning with iRobot and Electrolux in 2002. While the level of intelligence is not high in these systems, they navigate over wide areas and pilot in tight situations around homes using contact and non-contact sensors. Both of these robots use proprietary algorithms to increase coverage over simple random bounce.

The next level of autonomous task performance requires a robot to perform conditional tasks. For instance, security robots can be programmed to detect intruders and respond in a particular way depending upon where the intruder is. For example, Amazon launched its Astro for home monitoring, security and eldercare in September 2021.

=== Autonomous navigation ===
==== Indoor navigation ====
For a robot to associate behaviors with a place (localization) requires it to know where it is and to be able to navigate point-to-point. Such navigation began with wire-guidance in the 1970s and progressed in the early 2000s to beacon-based triangulation. Current commercial robots autonomously navigate based on sensing natural features. The first commercial robots to achieve this were Pyxus' HelpMate hospital robot and the CyberMotion guard robot, both designed by robotics pioneers in the 1980s. These robots originally used manually created CAD floor plans, sonar sensing and wall-following variations to navigate buildings. The next generation, such as MobileRobots' PatrolBot and autonomous wheelchair, both introduced in 2004, have the ability to create their own laser-based maps of a building and to navigate open areas as well as corridors. Their control system changes its path on the fly if something blocks the way.

At first, autonomous navigation was based on planar sensors, such as laser range-finders, that can only sense at one level. The most advanced systems now fuse information from various sensors for both localization (position) and navigation. Systems such as Motivity can rely on different sensors in various areas, depending upon which provides the most reliable data at the time, and can re-map a building autonomously.

Rather than climb stairs, which requires highly specialized hardware, most indoor robots navigate handicapped-accessible areas, controlling elevators and electronic doors. With such electronic access-control interfaces, robots can now freely navigate indoors. Autonomously climbing stairs and opening doors manually are topics of research at the current time.

As these indoor techniques continue to develop, vacuuming robots will gain the ability to clean a specific user-specified room or a whole floor. Security robots will be able to cooperatively surround intruders and cut off exits. These advances also bring concomitant protections: robots' internal maps typically permit "forbidden areas" to be defined to prevent robots from autonomously entering certain regions.

==== Outdoor navigation ====
Outdoor autonomy is most easily achieved in the air, since obstacles are rare. Cruise missiles are rather dangerous highly autonomous robots. Pilotless drone aircraft are increasingly used for reconnaissance. Some of these unmanned aerial vehicles (UAVs) are capable of flying their entire mission without any human interaction at all except possibly for the landing where a person intervenes using radio remote control. Some drones are capable of safe, automatic landings, however. SpaceX operates a number of autonomous spaceport drone ships, used to safely land and recover Falcon 9 rockets at sea. Few countries like India started working on robotic deliveries of food and other articles by drone.

Outdoor autonomy is the most difficult for ground vehicles, due to:

- Three-dimensional terrain
- Great disparities in surface density
- Weather exigencies
- Instability of the sensed environment

=== Open problems in autonomous robotics ===
Several open problems in autonomous robotics are special to the field rather than being a part of the general pursuit of AI. According to George A. Bekey's Autonomous Robots: From Biological Inspiration to Implementation and Control, problems include things such as making sure the robot is able to function correctly and not run into obstacles autonomously. Reinforcement learning has been used to control and plan the navigation of autonomous robots, specifically when a group of them operates in collaboration with each other.

Energy autonomy and foraging

Researchers concerned with creating true artificial life are concerned not only with intelligent control, but further with the capacity of the robot to find its own resources through foraging (looking for food, which includes both energy and spare parts).

This is related to autonomous foraging, a concern within the sciences of behavioral ecology, social anthropology, and human behavioral ecology; as well as robotics, artificial intelligence, and artificial life.

Systemic robustness and real-world brittleness

Autonomous robots remain highly vulnerable to unexpected changes in real-world environments. Even minor variations like a sudden beam of sunlight disrupting vision systems or unanticipated terrain irregularities can cause entire systems to fail. This brittleness stems from robotics being an inherently systems problem, where a deficiency in any module (perception, planning, actuation) can compromise the whole robot.

Open-world scene understanding

Robots often depend on datasets captured under controlled conditions, limiting their ability to generalize to novel, dynamic real-world scenarios. They struggle with unknown objects, occlusions, varying object scales, and rapidly changing environments. Developing self-supervised, lifelong learning systems that adapt to open-world conditions remains a pressing challenge.

Multi-robot coordination and decentralization

Scaling robot systems raises thorny issues in coordination, safety, and communication. In multi-agent navigation, challenges like deadlocks, selfish behaviors, and sample inefficiencies emerge. Innovations such as dividing planning into sub-problems, combining RL with imitation learning, hybrid centralized-decentralized approaches (e.g., prioritized communication learning), attention mechanisms, and graph transformers have shown promise, but large-scale, stable, real-time coordination remains an open frontier.

Simulation-to-real (“reality gap”) transfer

Deep reinforcement learning is a powerful tool for teaching robots navigation and control, but training in simulation introduces discrepancies when deployed in reality. The reality gap (or differences between simulated and real environments) continues to impede reliable deployment, despite strategies to mitigate it.

Hardware and bio hybrid constraints

Physical limitations of batteries, motors, sensors, and actuators constrain robot autonomy, endurance, and adaptability, especially for humanoid or soft-bio hybrid robots. While Biohybrid system (e.g., using living muscle tissue) hint at leveraging biological energy and actuation, they introduce radically new challenges in materials, integration, and control.

Ethics, liability, and societal integration

As robots become more autonomous, especially in public or collaborative roles, ethical and legal issues grow. Who is responsible when an autonomous system causes harm? Regulatory frameworks are still evolving to address liability, transparency, bias, and safety in systems like Self-driving car or socially interactive robots.

Embodied AI and industrial adoption

While AI algorithms have made strides, embedding them into robots (embodied AI) for real-world use remains slow-moving. Hardware constraints, economic viability, and infrastructure limitations limit widespread adoption. For instance, humanoid robots like “Pepper (robot)” failed to achieve ubiquity due to fundamental cost and complexity issues.

Human-robot interaction in unstructured settings

Robots working near or alongside people in a shared space need behavior that humans can interpret, anticipate and coordinate with. Designing interaction policies that balance efficiency, comfort, and safety, and that work across different cultures and contexts remains difficult. While robots can be pre-programmed with specific behaviors, real-world deployments inevitably encounter situations in which these capabilities prove insufficient.

== Societal impact and issues ==
As autonomous robots have grown in ability and technical levels, there has been increasing societal awareness and news coverage of the latest advances, and also some of the philosophical issues, economic effects, and societal impacts that arise from the roles and activities of autonomous robots.

Elon Musk has warned of the possible hazards and pitfalls of autonomous robots; however, his own company is one of the most prominent companies that is trying to devise new advanced technologies in this area.

In 2021, a United Nations group of government experts, known as the Convention on Certain Conventional Weapons – Group of Governmental Experts on Lethal Autonomous Weapons Systems, held a conference to highlight the ethical concerns which arise from the increasingly advanced technology for autonomous robots to wield weapons and to play a military role.

== Technical development ==
=== Early robots ===
The first autonomous robots were known as Elmer and Elsie, constructed in the late 1940s by W. Grey Walter. They were the first robots programmed to "think" the way biological brains do and were meant to have free will. Elmer and Elsie were often labeled as tortoises because of how they were shaped and the manner in which they moved. They were capable of phototaxis, the movement that occurs in response to light stimulus.

=== Space probes ===
The Mars rovers MER-A and MER-B (now known as Spirit rover and Opportunity rover) found the position of the Sun and navigated their own routes to destinations, on the fly, by:

- Mapping the surface with 3D vision
- Computing safe and unsafe areas on the surface within that field of vision
- Computing optimal paths across the safe area towards the desired destination
- Driving along the calculated route
- Repeating this cycle until either the destination is reached, or there is no known path to the destination

The planned ESA Rover, Rosalind Franklin rover, is capable of vision based relative localisation and absolute localisation to autonomously navigate safe and efficient trajectories to targets by:

- Reconstructing 3D models of the terrain surrounding the Rover using a pair of stereo cameras
- Determining safe and unsafe areas of the terrain and the general "difficulty" for the Rover to navigate the terrain
- Computing efficient paths across the safe area towards the desired destination
- Driving the Rover along the planned path
- Building up a navigation map of all previous navigation data

During the final NASA Sample Return Robot Centennial Challenge in 2016, a rover, named Cataglyphis, successfully demonstrated fully autonomous navigation, decision-making, and sample detection, retrieval, and return capabilities. The rover relied on a fusion of measurements from inertial sensors, wheel encoders, Lidar, and camera for navigation and mapping, instead of using GPS or magnetometers. During the 2-hour challenge, Cataglyphis traversed over 2.6 km and returned five different samples to its starting position.

=== General-use autonomous robots ===
The Seekur and MDARS robots demonstrate their autonomous navigation and security capabilities at an airbase.

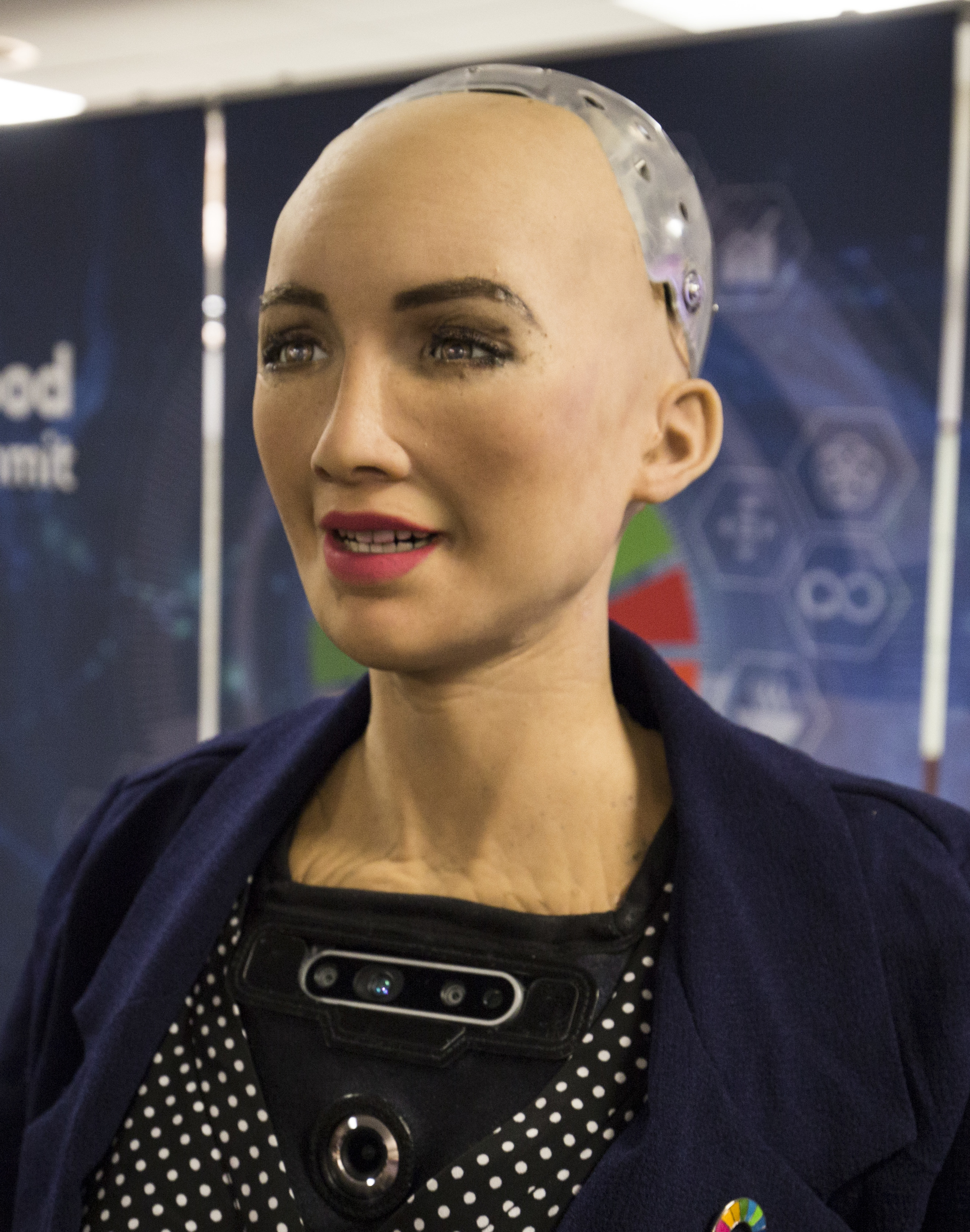
Sophia, a robot known for human-like appearance and interactions

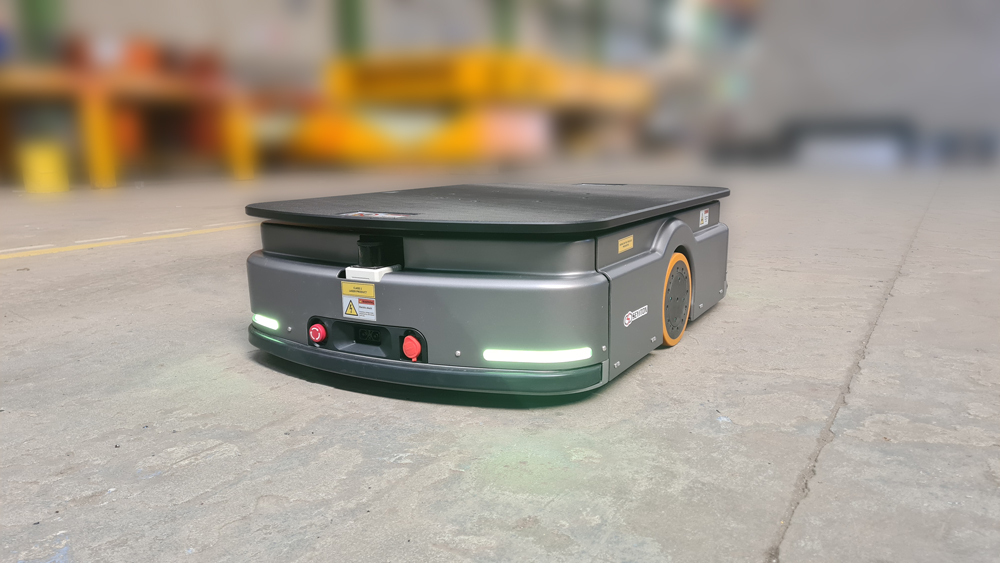
AMR transfer cart for in-factory transfer needs

The Seekur robot was the first commercially available robot to demonstrate MDARS-like capabilities for general use by airports, utility plants, corrections facilities and Homeland Security.

The DARPA Grand Challenge and DARPA Urban Challenge have encouraged development of even more autonomous capabilities for ground vehicles, while this has been the demonstrated goal for aerial robots since 1990 as part of the AUVSI International Aerial Robotics Competition.

AMR transfer carts developed by Seyiton are used to transfer loads of up to 1500 kilograms inside factories.

Between 2013 and 2017, TotalEnergies has held the ARGOS Challenge to develop the first autonomous robot for oil and gas production sites. The robots had to face adverse outdoor conditions such as rain, wind and extreme temperatures.

Some significant current robots include:

- Sophia is an autonomous robot that is known for its human-like appearance and behavior compared to previous robotic variants. As of 2018, Sophia's architecture includes scripting software, a chat system, and OpenCog, an AI system designed for general reasoning. Sophia imitates human gestures and facial expressions and is able to answer certain questions and to make simple conversations on predefined topics (e.g. on the weather). The AI program analyses conversations and extracts data that allows it to improve responses in the future.
- Nine other robot humanoid "siblings" who were also created by Hanson Robotics. Fellow Hanson robots are Alice, Albert Einstein Hubo, BINA48, Han, Jules, Professor Einstein, Philip K. Dick Android, Zeno, and Joey Chaos. Around 2019–20, Hanson released "Little Sophia" as a companion that could teach children how to code, including support for Python, Blockly, and Raspberry Pi.

=== Military autonomous robots ===
Lethal autonomous weapons (LAWs) are a type of autonomous robot military system that can independently search for and engage targets based on programmed constraints and descriptions. LAWs are also known as lethal autonomous weapon systems (LAWS), autonomous weapon systems (AWS), robotic weapons, killer robots or slaughterbots. LAWs may operate in the air, on land, on water, under water, or in space. The autonomy of current systems as of 2018 was restricted in the sense that a human gives the final command to attack – though there are exceptions with certain "defensive" systems.

- UGV Interoperability Profile (UGV IOP), Robotics and Autonomous Systems – Ground IOP (RAS-G IOP), was originally a research program started by the United States Department of Defense (DoD) to organize and maintain open architecture interoperability standards for Unmanned Ground Vehicles (UGV). The IOP was initially created by U.S. Army Robotic Systems Joint Project Office (RS JPO):
- In October 2019, Textron and Howe & Howe unveiled their Ripsaw M5 vehicle, and on 9 January 2020, the U.S. Army awarded them a contract for the Robotic Combat Vehicle-Medium (RCV-M) program. Four Ripsaw M5 prototypes are to be delivered and used in a company-level to determine the feasibility of integrating unmanned vehicles into ground combat operations in late 2021. It can reach speeds of more than 40 mph (64 km/h), has a combat weight of 10.5 tons and a payload capacity of 8,000 lb (3,600 kg). The RCV-M is armed with a 30 mm autocannon and a pair of anti-tank missiles. The standard armor package can withstand 12.7×108mm rounds, with optional add-on armor increasing weight to up to 20 tons. If disabled, it will retain the ability to shoot, with its sensors and radio uplink prioritized to continue transmitting as its primary function.
- Crusher is a 13,200-pound (6,000 kg) autonomous off-road Unmanned Ground Combat Vehicle developed by researchers at the Carnegie Mellon University's National Robotics Engineering Center for DARPA. It is a follow-up on the previous Spinner vehicle. DARPA's technical name for the Crusher is Unmanned Ground Combat Vehicle and Perceptor Integration System, and the whole project is known by the acronym UPI, which stands for Unmanned Ground Combat Vehicle PerceptOR Integration.
- CATS Warrior will be an autonomous wingman drone capable of take-off & landing from land & in sea from an aircraft carrier, it will team up with the existing fighter platforms of the IAF like Tejas, Su-30 MKI and Jaguar which will act like its mothership.
- The Warrior is primarily envisioned for the Indian Air Force use and a similar, smaller version will be designed for the Indian Navy. It would be controlled by the mothership and accomplish tasks such as scouting, absorbing enemy fire, attacking the targets if necessary with its internal & external pylons weapons or sacrifice itself by crashing into the target.
- The SGR-A1 is a type of autonomous sentry gun that was jointly developed by Samsung Techwin (now Hanwha Aerospace) and Korea University to assist South Korean troops in the Korean Demilitarized Zone. It is widely considered as the first unit of its kind to have an integrated system that includes surveillance, tracking, firing, and voice recognition. While units of the SGR-A1 have been reportedly deployed, their number is unknown due to the project being "highly classified".

== Types of robots ==
=== Humanoid ===
Tesla Robot and NVIDIA GR00T are humanoid robots. Humanoids are machines that are designed to mimic the human form in appearance and behavior. These robots typically have a head, torso, arms, and legs, making them look like humans.

=== Delivery robot ===
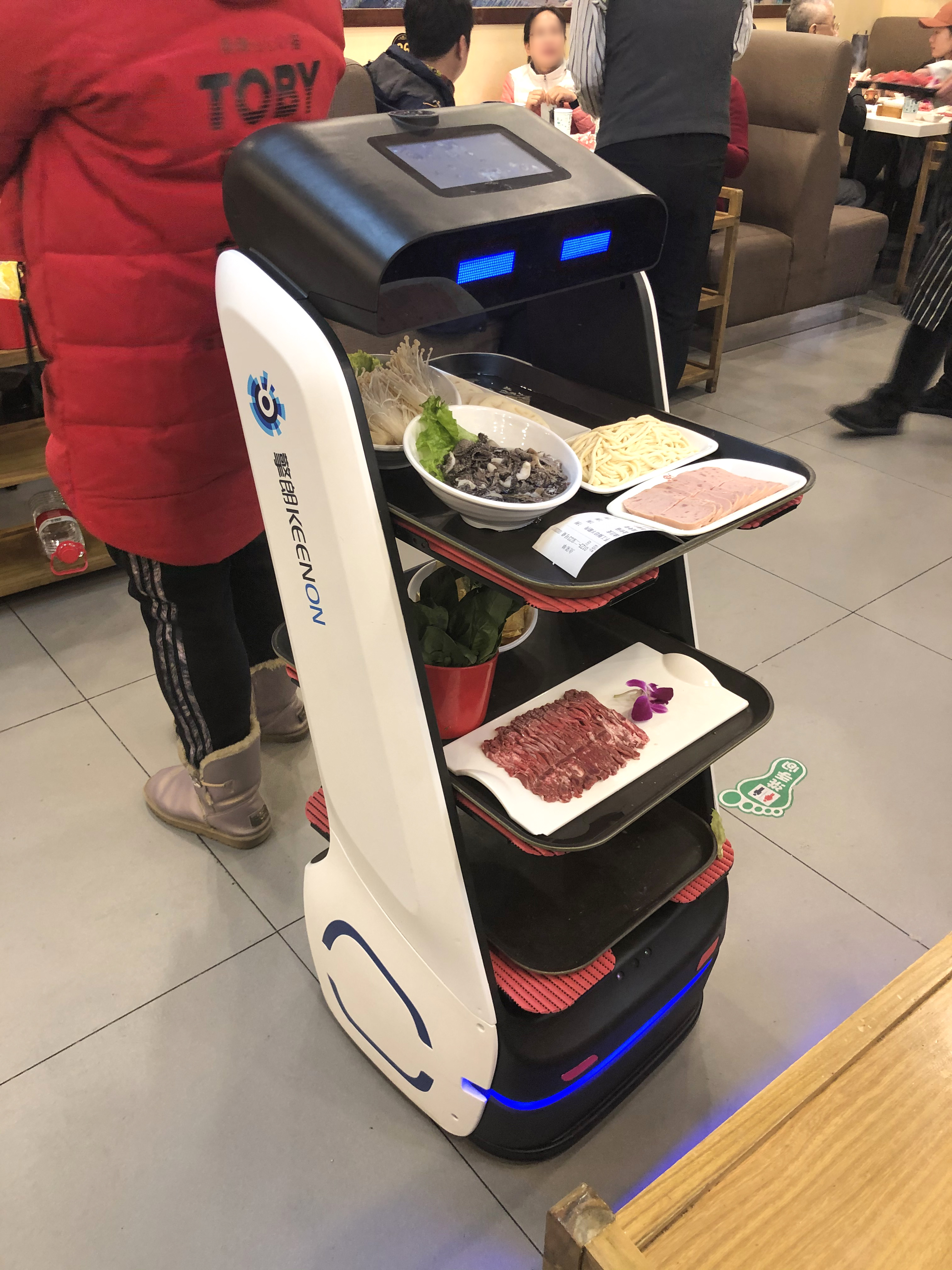
A food delivery robot

Autonomous delivery robots (ADRs), defined as “pedestrian-sized robots that deliver items to customers without the intervention of a delivery person”, have been presented as a possible solution to last-mile delivery challenges. The shortage of delivery personnel has compelled large e-commerce companies, such as Amazon, Flipkart, and Grofers, to double their previous pay rates to attract and retain employees. Furthermore, population growth and urbanisation have exacerbated existing delivery challenges in congested and polluted cities. ADRs are expected to reduce emissions and improve accessibility to delivery services. ADRs may offer advantages in areas dominated by one-way streets, although the use of multiple robots may be necessary. They may also be suitable for areas that restrict or prohibit cars, as they can use pavements and cycling lanes. Furthermore, ADRs can increase the economic efficiency of deliveries, with a cost of €0.025 per kilometre compared with €0.371 per kilometer for a light commercial vehicle. ADRs can also reduce delivery distances owing to these advantages. During the COVID-19 pandemic, the use of ADRs offered the possibility of increasing resilience and minimizing human interaction in the distribution chain.

=== Charging robot ===
An automatic charging robot, unveiled on July 27, 2022, is an arm-shaped robot to charge an electric vehicle. It has been running a pilot operation at Hyundai Motor Group's headquarters since 2021. VISION AI System based on deep learning technology has been applied. When an electric vehicle is parked in front of the charger, the robot arm recognizes the charger of the electric vehicle and derives coordinates. And automatically insert a connector into the electric car and operate fast charging. The robot arm is configured in a vertical multi-joint structure so that it can be applied to chargers at different locations for each vehicle. In addition, waterproof and dustproof functions are applied.

=== Construction robots ===
Construction robots include aerial drones, quadrupeds, wheeled unmanned ground vehicles (UGVs), teleoperated manipulators, collaborative arms, gantry printers, climbing robots, and wearable exoskeletons. These platforms differ in mobility, payload, precision, autonomy, and sensing capabilities, making them suitable for different classes of tasks. Without systematically linking robot types to task domains, it becomes difficult to evaluate the capabilities of each robotic platform, identify tasks that remain underserved, and determine how technological capabilities correspond to construction needs.

Task characteristics also shape the human roles required. The dataset of 375 papers shows that drilling, excavation, and demolition still rely heavily on teleoperation, while collaborative assembly tasks increasingly involve humans in teammate roles. Aerial inspections and layout robots often place humans in supervisory positions. These distinctions cannot be inferred from robot technology alone; they arise from the interplay between task hazards, precision requirements, and environmental uncertainty.

=== Research and education mobile robots ===
Research and education mobile robots are mainly used during a prototyping phase in the process of building full scale robots. They are a scaled down version of bigger robots with the same types of sensors, kinematics and software stack (e.g. ROS). They are often extendable and provide comfortable programming interface and development tools. Next to full scale robot prototyping they are also used for education, especially at university level, where more and more labs about programming autonomous vehicles are being introduced.

== Legislation ==
In March 2016, a bill was introduced in Washington, D.C., allowing pilot ground robotic deliveries. The program was to take place from September 15 through the end of December 2017. The robots were limited to a weight of 50 pounds unloaded and a maximum speed of 10 miles per hour. In case the robot stopped moving because of malfunction the company was required to remove it from the streets within 24 hours. There were allowed only 5 robots to be tested per company at a time. A 2017 version of the Personal Delivery Device Act bill was under review as of March 2017.

In February 2017, a bill was passed in the US state of Virginia via the House bill, HB2016, and the Senate bill, SB1207, that will allow autonomous delivery robots to travel on sidewalks and use crosswalks statewide beginning on July 1, 2017. The robots will be limited to a maximum speed of 10 mph and a maximum weight of 50 pounds. In the states of Idaho and Florida there are also talks about passing the similar legislature.

In November 2017, the San Francisco Board of Supervisors announced that companies would need to get a city permit in order to test these robots. In addition, the Board banned sidewalk delivery robots from making non-research deliveries.

== See also ==
=== Scientific concepts ===
- Artificial intelligence
- Cognitive robotics
- Developmental robotics
- Evolutionary robotics
- Simultaneous localization and mapping
- Teleoperation
- von Neumann machine
- Wake-up robot problem
- William Grey Walter

=== Types of robots ===
- Autonomous car
- Autonomous research robot
- Autonomous spaceport drone ship
- Domestic robot
- Humanoid robot

=== Specific robot models ===
- AIBO
- Amazon Scout
- Microbotics
- RoboBee
- Robomow

=== Others ===
- Remote-control vehicle
- Robot control
