= Morphogenetic robotics =

Morphogenetic robotics generally refers to the methodologies that address challenges in robotics inspired by biological morphogenesis. This field overlaps with Morphogenetic Engineering that's attenuated inside Amorphous Computation.

== Background ==
=== Differences to epigenetic ===
Morphogenetic robotics is related to, but differs from, epigenetic robotics. The main difference between morphogenetic robotics and epigenetic robotics is that the former focuses on self-organization, self-reconfiguration, self-assembly and self-adaptive control of robots using genetic and cellular mechanisms inspired from biological early morphogenesis (activity-independent development), during which the body and controller of the organisms are developed simultaneously, whereas the latter emphasizes the development of robots' cognitive capabilities, such as language, emotion and social skills, through experience during the lifetime (activity-dependent development). Morphogenetic robotics is closely connected to developmental biology and systems biology, whilst epigenetic robotics is related to developmental cognitive neuroscience emerged from cognitive science, developmental psychology and neuroscience.

=== Topics ===
Morphogenetic robotics includes, but is not limited to the following main topics:

- "Morphogenetic swarm robotics" deals with the self-organization of multi-robots using genetic and cellular mechanisms governing the biological early morphogenesis;
- "Morphogenetic modular robots" are when modular robots adapt their configuration autonomously using morphogenetic principles;
- "Developmental approaches" deals with the design of the body plan of robots, such as sensors and actuators, as well as the design of the controller, e.g., a neural controller using a generative coding gene regulatory network model.

== See also ==
- Artificial life
- Cognitive robotics
- Developmental robotics
- Evolutionary robotics
- Evolutionary developmental robotics
- Modular design
