= Exploration =

Investigating an unfamiliar area

Exploration is the process of exploring, an activity which has some expectation of discovery. Organised exploration is largely a human activity, but exploratory activity is common to most organisms capable of directed locomotion and the ability to learn, and has been described in, amongst others, social insects foraging behaviour, where feedback from returning individuals affects the activity of other members of the group.

== Types ==
=== Geographical ===
Ortelius's 1570 world map, the world's first modern atlas

Geographical exploration, sometimes considered the default meaning for the more general term exploration, is the practice of discovering lands and regions of the planet Earth remote or relatively inaccessible from the origin of the explorer. The surface of the Earth not covered by water has been relatively comprehensively explored, as access is generally relatively straightforward, but underwater and subterranean areas are far less known, and even at the surface, much is still to be discovered in detail in the more remote and inaccessible wilderness areas.

Two major eras of geographical exploration occurred in human history: The first, covering most of Human history, saw people moving out of Africa, settling in new lands, and developing distinct cultures in relative isolation. Early explorers settled in Europe and Asia; about 14,000 years ago, some crossed the Ice Age land bridge from Siberia to Alaska, and moved southwards to settle in the Americas. For the most part, these cultures were ignorant of each other's existence. The second period of exploration, occurring over the last 10,000 years, saw increased cross-cultural exchange through trade and exploration, and marked a new era of cultural intermingling, and more recently, convergence.

Early writings about exploration date back to the 4th millennium B.C. in ancient Egypt. One of the earliest and most impactful thinkers on exploration was Ptolemy in the 2nd century AD. Between the 5th century and 15th century AD, most exploration was done by Chinese and Arab explorers. This was followed by the Age of Discovery after European scholars rediscovered the works of early Latin and Greek geographers. While the Age of Discovery was partly driven by land routes outside of Europe becoming unsafe, and a desire for conquest, the 17th century also saw exploration driven by nobler motives, including scientific discovery and the expansion of knowledge about the world. This broader knowledge of the world's geography meant that people were able to make world maps, depicting all land known. The first modern atlas was the Theatrum Orbis Terrarum, published by Abraham Ortelius, which included a world map that depicted all of Earth's continents.

=== Underwater ===
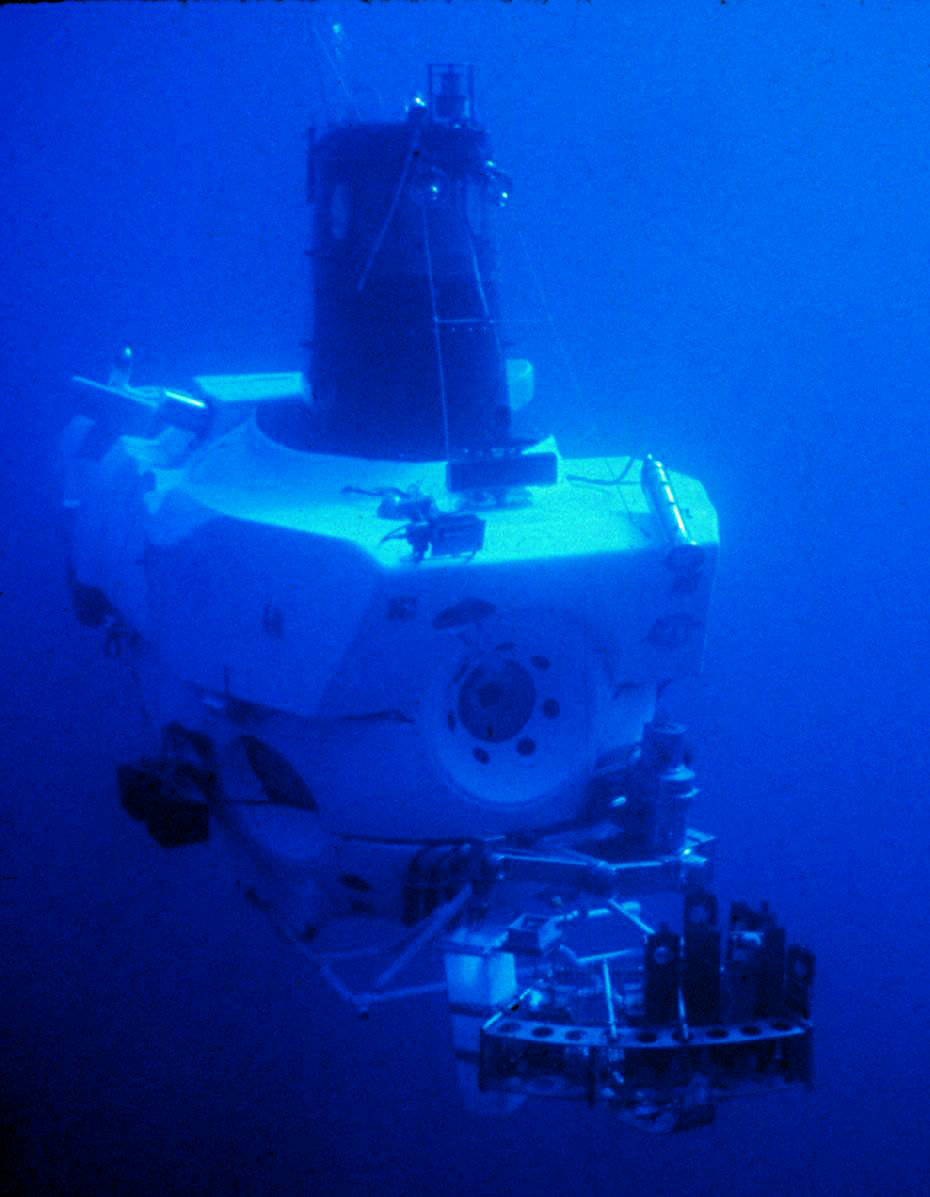
DSV Alvin, a crewed submersible, much used for underwater exploration

Underwater exploration is the exploration of any underwater environment, either by direct observation by the explorer, or by remote observation and measurement under the direction of the investigators. Systematic, targeted exploration, with simultaneous survey, and recording of data, followed by data processing, interpretation and publication, is the most effective method to increase understanding of the ocean and other underwater regions, so they can be effectively managed, conserved, regulated, and their resources discovered, accessed, and used. Less than 10% of the ocean has been mapped in any detail, even less has been visually observed, and the total diversity of life and distribution of populations is similarly incompletely known.

=== Space ===
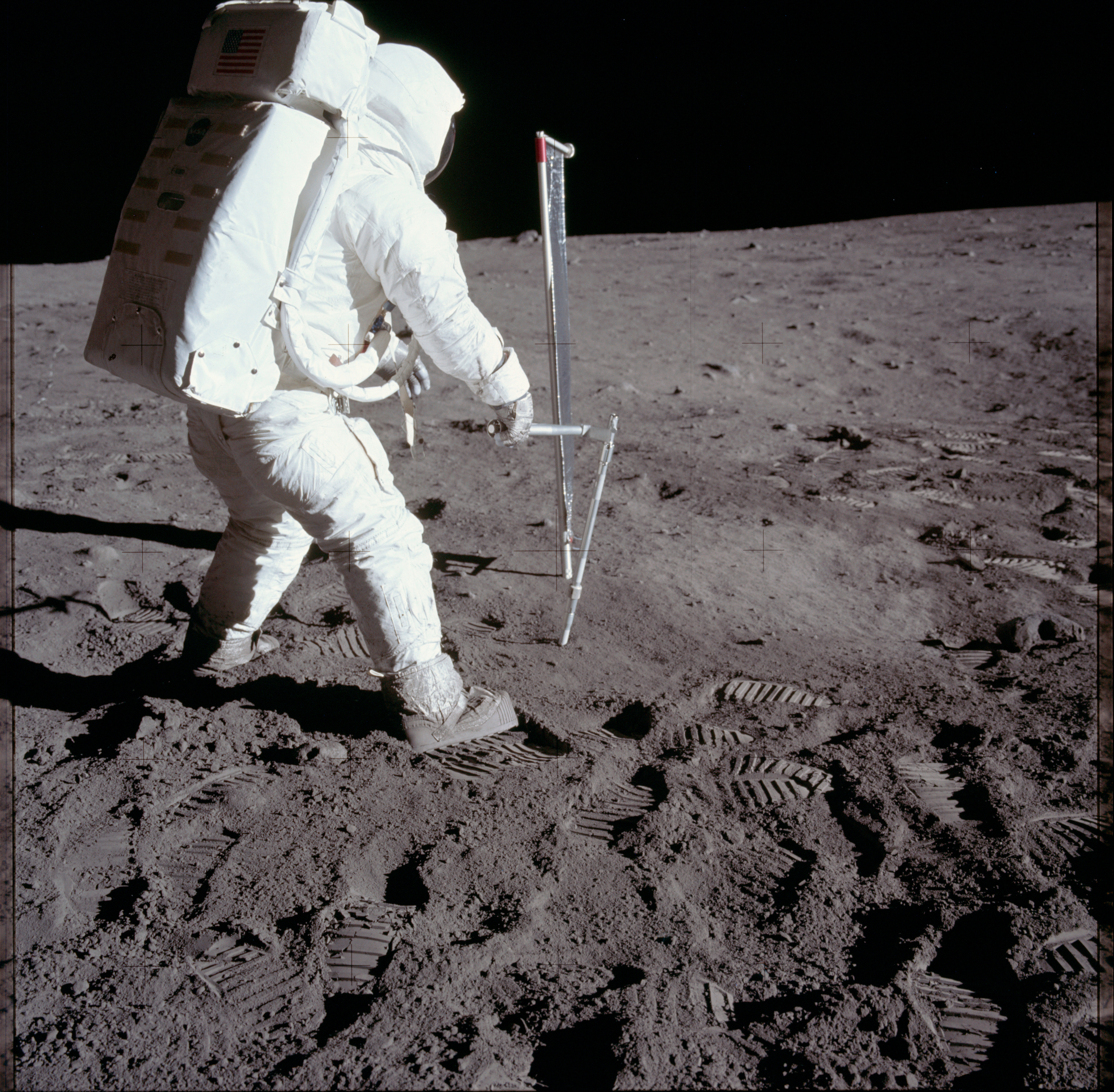
Buzz Aldrin taking a core sample of the Moon during the Apollo 11 mission

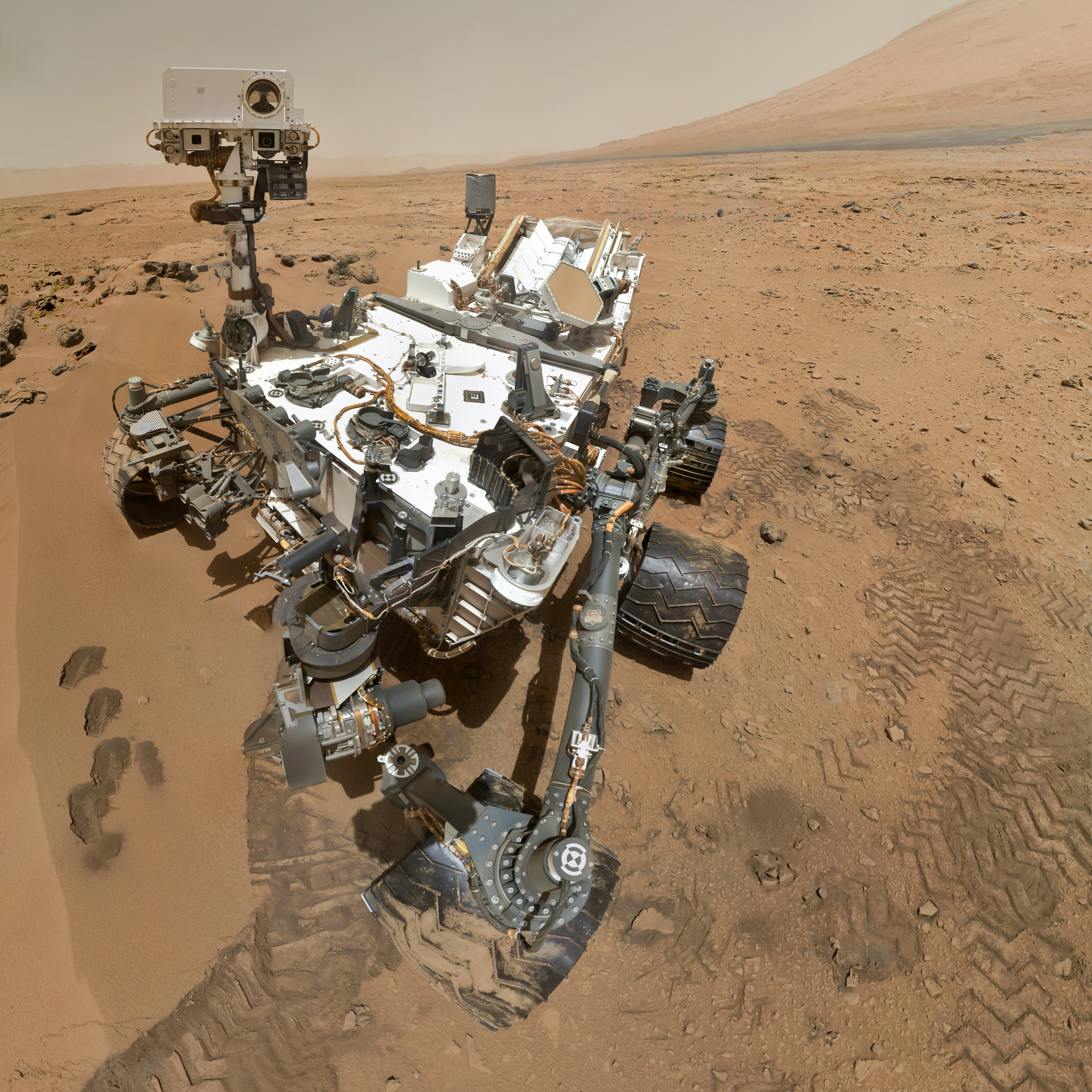
Self-portrait of Curiosity rover on Mars's surface

Space exploration is the use of astronomy and space technology to explore outer space. While the exploration of space is currently carried out mainly by astronomers with telescopes, its physical exploration is conducted both by uncrewed robotic space probes and human spaceflight. Space exploration, like its classical form astronomy, is one of the main sources for space science.

While the observation of objects in space, known as astronomy, predates reliable recorded history, it was the development of large and relatively efficient rockets during the mid-twentieth century that allowed physical extraterrestrial exploration to become a reality. Common rationales for exploring space include advancing scientific research, national prestige, uniting different nations, ensuring the future survival of humanity, and developing military and strategic advantages against other countries.

=== Urban ===
Urban exploration is the exploration of manmade structures, usually abandoned ruins or hidden components of the manmade environment. Photography and historical interest/documentation are heavily featured in the hobby, sometimes involving trespassing onto private property.

The activity presents various risks, including physical danger and, if done illegally and/or without permission, the possibility of arrest and punishment. Some activities associated with urban exploration violate local or regional laws and certain broadly interpreted anti-terrorism laws, or can be considered trespassing or invasion of privacy.

=== Geological ===
Traditionally, mineral exploration relied on direct observation of mineralisation in rock outcrops or in sediments. More recently, however, mineral exploration also includes the use of geologic, geophysical, and geochemical tools to search for anomalies, which can narrow the search area. The area to be prospected should be covered sufficiently to minimize the risk of missing something important, but it can take into account previous experience that certain geological evidence correlates with a very low probability of finding the desired minerals. Other evidence indicates a high probability, making it efficient to concentrate on the areas of high probability when they are found, and for the skipping areas of very low probability. Once an anomaly has been identified and interpreted to be a prospect, more detailed exploration of the potential reserve can be done by soil sampling, drilling, seismic surveys, and similar methods to assess the most appropriate method and type of mining and the economic potential.

== Modes ==
Systematic examination or investigation

Systematic investigation is done in an orderly and organised manner, generally following a plan, though it should be a flexible plan, which is amenable to rational adaptation to suit circumstances, as the concept of exploration accepts the possibility of the unexpected being encountered, and the plan must survive such encounters to remain useful.

Diagnostical examination
Diagnosis is the identification of the nature and cause of a given phenomenon. Diagnosis is used in many different disciplines, such as medicine, forensic science and engineering failure analysis, with variations in the use of logic, analytics, and experience, to determine causality. A diagnostic examination explores the available evidence to try to identify likely causes for observed effects, and may also investigate further with the intention to discover additional relevant evidence. This is an instance of inspective and extrinsic exploration.

To seek experience first hand
Exploration as the pursuit of first hand experience and knowledge is often an example of diversive and intrinsic exploration when done for personal satisfaction and entertainment, though it may also be for purposes of learning or verifying the information provided by others, which is an extrinsic motivation, and which is likely to be characterised by a relatively systematic approach. As the personal aspect of the experience is central to this type of exploration, the same region or range of experiences may be explored repeatedly by different people, for each can have a reasonable expectation of personal discovery.

Exploratory behavior in animals
Exploratory behavior has been defined as behavior directed toward getting information about the environment, or to locate things such as food or individuals. Exploration usually follows a sequence, in which four stages can be identified. The first phase is search, in which the subject moves around to contact relevant stimuli, to which the subject pays attention, and may approach and investigate. The sequence may be interrupted by flight if danger is recognised, or a return to search if the stimulus is not interesting or useful.

In all these definitions there is an implication of novelty, or unfamiliarity or the expectation of discovery in the exploration, whereas a survey implies directed examination, but not necessarily discovery of any previously unknown or unexpected information. The activities are not mutually exclusive, and often occur simultaneously to a variable extent. The same field of investigation or region may be explored at different times by different explorers with different motivations, who may make similar or different discoveries.

== See also ==
- Exploration geophysics – Applied branch of geophysics and economic geology
- Exploration problem – Use of a robot to maximize the knowledge over a particular area
- Intrinsic motivation (artificial intelligence) – Mechanism for enabling artificial agents to exhibit curiosity
- Motivation – Inner state causing goal-directed behavior
- Overlanding – Travel to remote places focused on the journey more than destination
- Simultaneous localization and mapping – Computational navigational technique used by robots and autonomous vehicles
- United States Exploring Expedition – American exploring and surveying expedition, 1838 to 1842

Explorers:

- List of explorers
- List of maritime explorers
