= Empowerment =

Autonomy and self-determination in people and communities

Empowerment is the degree of autonomy and self-determination people and communities have. This enables them to represent their interests responsibly and self-determinedly, acting under their own authority. It is the process of becoming stronger and more confident, especially in controlling one's life and claiming one's rights. Empowerment as action refers both to the process of self-empowerment and to professional support of people, which enables them to overcome their sense of powerlessness and lack of influence, and to recognize and use their resources.

As a term, empowerment originates from American community psychology and is associated with the social scientist Julian Rappaport (1981).

In social work, empowerment forms a practical approach to resource-oriented intervention. In citizenship and democratic education, empowerment is seen as a tool to increase citizens' responsibility. Empowerment is a key concept in the discourse on promoting civic engagement. Empowerment, as a concept, which is characterized by a move away from a deficit-oriented towards a more strength-oriented perception, can increasingly be found in management concepts, as well as in the areas of continuing education and self-help.

== Definitions ==
Robert Adams points to the limitations of any single definition of 'empowerment', and the danger that academic or specialist definitions might take away the word and the connected practices from the very people they are supposed to belong to. Still, he offers a minimal definition of the term: 'Empowerment: the capacity of individuals, groups and/or communities to take control of their circumstances, exercise power and achieve their own goals, and the process by which, individually and collectively, they are able to help themselves and others to maximize the quality of their lives.'

One definition for the term is "an intentional, ongoing process centered in the local community, involving mutual respect, critical reflection, caring, and group participation, through which people lacking an equal share of resources gain greater access to and control over those resources".

Rappaport's (1984) definition includes: "Empowerment is viewed as a process: the mechanism by which people, organizations, and communities gain mastery over their lives."

Sociological empowerment often addresses members of groups that social discrimination processes have excluded from decision-making processes through – for example – discrimination based on disability, race, ethnicity, religion, or gender. Empowerment as a methodology is also associated with feminism.

== Process ==
Empowerment is the process of obtaining basic opportunities for marginalized people, either directly by those people, or through the help of non-marginalized others who share their own access to these opportunities. It also includes actively thwarting attempts to deny those opportunities. Empowerment also includes encouraging, and developing the skills for, self-sufficiency, with a focus on eliminating the future need for charity or welfare in the individuals of the group. This process can be difficult to start and to implement effectively.

=== Strategy ===
One empowerment strategy is to assist marginalized people to create their own nonprofit organization, using the rationale that only the marginalized people, themselves, can know what their own people need most, and that control of the organization by outsiders can actually help to further entrench marginalization. Charitable organizations lead from outside of the community, for example, can disempower the community by entrenching a dependence charity or welfare. A nonprofit organization can target strategies that cause structural changes, reducing the need for ongoing dependence. Red Cross, for example, can focus on improving the health of indigenous people, but does not have authority in its charter to install water-delivery and purification systems, even though the lack of such a system profoundly, directly and negatively impacts health. A nonprofit composed of the indigenous people, however, could ensure their own organization does have such authority and could set their own agendas, make their own plans, seek the needed resources, do as much of the work as they can, and take responsibility – and credit – for the success of their projects (or the consequences, should they fail).

The process of which enables individuals/groups to fully access personal or collective power, authority and influence, and to employ that strength when engaging with other people, institutions or society. In other words, "Empowerment is not giving people power, people already have plenty of power, in the wealth of their knowledge and motivation, to do their jobs magnificently. We define empowerment as letting this power out." It encourages people to gain the skills and knowledge that will allow them to overcome obstacles in life or work environment and ultimately, help them develop within themselves or in the society.

To empower a female "...sounds as though we are dismissing or ignoring males, but the truth is, both genders desperately need to be equally empowered." Empowerment occurs through improvement of conditions, standards, events, and a global perspective of life.

=== Criticism ===
Before there can be the finding that a particular group requires empowerment and that therefore their self-esteem needs to be consolidated on the basis of awareness of their strengths, there needs to be a deficit diagnosis usually carried out by experts assessing the problems of this group. The fundamental asymmetry of the relationship between experts and clients is usually not questioned by empowerment processes. It also needs to be regarded critically, in how far the empowerment approach is really applicable to all patients/clients. It is particularly questionable whether [mentally ill] people in acute crisis situations are in a position to make their own decisions. According to Albert Lenz, people behave primarily regressive in acute crisis situations and tend to leave the responsibility to professionals. It must be assumed, therefore, that the implementation of the empowerment concept requires a minimum level of communication and reflectivity of the persons involved.

Another criticism is that empowerment implies that the drive for change comes from an external person. For example, in healthcare, a patient being encouraged by their doctor to track their symptoms and adjust their medication accordingly would be empowerment, where as a patient deciding on their own that they wanted to improve their medication regimen and thus started tracking would be an example of self-empowerment. A recently coined term, self-empowerment "describes patients' and informal caregivers' power to perform activities that are not mandated by health care and to take control over their own lives and self-management with increased self-efficacy and confidence".

== In social work and community psychology ==
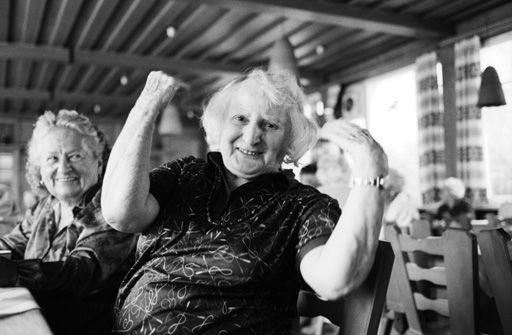
Empowerment in the work for senior citizens in a residential home in Germany

In social work, empowerment offers an approach that allows social workers to increase the capacity for self-help of their clients. For example, this allows clients not to be seen as passive, helpless 'victims' to be rescued but instead as a self-empowered person fighting abuse/ oppression; a fight, in which the social worker takes the position of a facilitator, instead of the position of a 'rescuer'.

Marginalized people who lack self-sufficiency become, at a minimum, dependent on charity, or welfare. They lose their self-confidence because they cannot be fully self-supporting. The opportunities that denied them also deprive them of the pride of accomplishment which others, who have those opportunities, can develop for themselves. This in turn can lead to psychological, social and even mental health problems. "Marginalized" here refers to the overt or covert trends within societies whereby those perceived as lacking desirable traits or deviating from the group norms tend to be excluded by wider society and ostracized as undesirables.

=== In health promotion practice and research ===
As a concept, and model of practice, empowerment is also used in health promotion research and practice. The key principle is for individuals to gain increased control over factors that influence their health status.

To empower individuals and to obtain more equity in health, it is also important to address health-related behaviors.

Studies suggest that health promotion interventions aiming at empowering adolescents should enable active learning activities, use visualizing tools to facilitate self-reflection, and allow the adolescents to influence intervention activities.

== In economics ==
According to Robert Adams, there is a long tradition in the UK and the USA respectively to advance forms of self-help that have developed and contributed to more recent concepts of empowerment. For example, the free enterprise economic theories of Milton Friedman embraced self-help as a respectable contributor to the economy. Both the Republicans in the US and the Conservative government of Margaret Thatcher built on these theories. 'At the same time, the mutual aid aspects of the concept of self-help retained some currency with socialists and democrats.'

In economic development, the empowerment approach focuses on mobilizing the self-help efforts of the poor, rather than providing them with social welfare. Economic empowerment is also the empowering of previously disadvantaged sections of the population, for example, in many previously colonized African countries.

=== Consumer empowerment ===
A consumer empowerment strategy was put in place in the United Kingdom by the 2010-2015 coalition government. The strategy, produced by the Department for Business, Innovation and Skills and the Behavioural Insights Team at the UK Cabinet Office, sought to introduce voluntary measures and "nudges" which could help consumers "find and adopt the best choices for their circumstances and needs". Activities promoted by the strategy included the midata programme under the direction of Professor Nigel Shadbolt, annual credit card usage statements, collective purchasing schemes, and presentational work on Energy Performance Certificates, motor vehicle sales literature and food hygiene ratings, so that consumers can make better use of the information they contain.

=== Customer empowerment ===
Companies that empower their customers have the potential to create superior products at reduced costs and risks, provided that customers are willing and able to contribute valuable input in the new product development process. Businesses that involve and empower customers in the process of creating new products can sometimes have a competitive edge over traditional firms that do not give their customers such involvement. This advantage is evident in the fact that consumers generally prefer the former. When customers have the authority to choose which products are brought to market, they exhibit increased demand for the chosen products, even when they are objectively of the same quality. This apparently irrational phenomenon can be explained by the heightened sense of psychological ownership that consumers develop for the selected products. Two conditions limit this effect: (1) it diminishes when the joint decision-making outcome does not align with consumers' preferences and (2) when consumers lack confidence in their ability to make informed decisions.

=== Increasingly engaged corporate directors ===
The World Pensions Council (WPC) has argued that large institutional investors such as pension funds and endowments are exercising a greater influence on the process of adding and replacing corporate directors – as they are themselves steered to do so by their own board members (pension trustees).

This could eventually put more pressure on the CEOs of publicly listed companies, as "more than ever before, many [North American], UK and European Union pension trustees speak enthusiastically about flexing their fiduciary muscles for the UN's Sustainable Development Goals", and other ESG-centric investment practices

== Legal ==
Legal empowerment happens when marginalised people or groups use the legal mobilisation i.e., law, legal systems and justice mechanisms to improve or transform their social, political or economic situations. Legal empowerment approaches are interested in understanding how they can use the law to advance interests and priorities of the marginalised.

According to 'Open society foundations' (an NGO) "Legal empowerment is about strengthening the capacity of all people to exercise their rights, either as individuals or as members of a community. Legal empowerment is about grass root justice, about ensuring that law is not confined to books or courtrooms, but rather is available and meaningful to ordinary people.

Lorenzo Cotula in his book ' Legal Empowerment for Local Resource Control ' outlines the fact that legal tools for securing local resource rights are enshrined in legal system, does not necessarily mean that local resource users are in position to use them and benefit from them. The state legal system is constrained by a range of different factors – from lack of resources to cultural issues. Among these factors economic, geographic, linguistic and other constraints on access to courts, lack of legal awareness as well as legal assistance tend to be recurrent problems.

In many context, marginalised groups do not trust the legal system owing to the widespread manipulation that it has historically been subjected to by the more powerful. 'To what extent one knows the law, and make it work for themselves with 'para legal tools', is legal empowerment; assisted utilizing innovative approaches like legal literacy and awareness training, broadcasting legal information, conducting participatory legal discourses, supporting local resource user in negotiating with other agencies and stake holders and to strategies combining use of legal processes with advocacy along with media engagement, and socio legal mobilisation.

Sometimes groups are marginalized by society at large, with governments participating in the process of marginalization. Equal opportunity laws which actively oppose such marginalization, are supposed to allow empowerment to occur. These laws made it illegal to restrict access to schools and public places based on race. They can also be seen as a symptom of minorities' and women's empowerment through lobbying.

== Gender ==
Gender empowerment conventionally refers to the empowerment of women, which is a significant topic of discussion in regards to development and economics nowadays. It also points to approaches regarding other marginalized genders in a particular political or social context. This approach to empowerment is partly informed by feminism and employed legal empowerment by building on international human rights. Empowerment is one of the main procedural concerns when addressing human rights and development. The Human Development and Capabilities Approach, The Millennium Development Goals, and other credible approaches/goals point to empowerment and participation as a necessary step if a country is to overcome the obstacles associated with poverty and development. The UN Sustainable Development Goals (SDG 5) targets gender equality and women's empowerment for the global development agenda.

== In workplace management ==
According to Thomas A. Potterfield, many organizational theorists and practitioners regard employee empowerment as one of the most important and popular contemporary management concepts.

In the sphere of management and organizational theory, "empowerment" often refers loosely to processes for giving subordinates (or workers generally) greater discretion and resources: distributing control in order to better serve both customers and the interests of employing organizations. It also giving employees the authority to take initiatives, make their own decisions, find and execute solutions. Data from survey research using confirmatory factor analysis, empowerment can be captures through four dimensions, namely meaning, competence, self-determination, and impact; whereas some exploratory factor analysis identifies only three dimensions, namely meaning, competence, and influence (a conflation of self-determination and impact).

=== Evolution ===
One account of the history of workplace empowerment in the United States recalls the clash of management styles in railroad construction in the American West in the mid-19th century, where "traditional" hierarchical East-Coast models of control encountered individualistic pioneer workers, strongly supplemented by methods of efficiency-oriented "worker responsibility" brought to the scene by Chinese laborers. In this case, empowerment at the level of work teams or brigades achieved a notable (but short-lived) demonstrated superiority. See the views of Robert L. Webb.

Since the 1980s and 1990s, empowerment has become a point of interest in management concepts and business administration. In this context, empowerment involves approaches that promise greater participation and integration to the employee in order to cope with their tasks as independently as possible and responsibly can. A strength-based approach known as "empowerment circle" has become an instrument of organizational development. Multidisciplinary empowerment teams aim for the development of quality circles to improve the organizational culture, strengthening the motivation and the skills of employees. The target of subjective job satisfaction of employees is pursued through flat hierarchies, participation in decisions, opening of creative effort, a positive, appreciative team culture, self-evaluation, taking responsibility (for results), more self-determination and constant further learning. The optimal use of existing potential and abilities can supposedly be better reached by satisfied and active workers. Here, knowledge management contributes significantly to implement employee participation as a guiding principle, for example through the creation of communities of practice.

However, it is important to ensure that the individual employee has the skills to meet their allocated responsibilities and that the company's structure sets up the right incentives for employees to reward their taking responsibilities. Otherwise there is a danger of being overwhelmed or even becoming lethargic.

=== Implications for company culture ===
Empowerment of employees requires a culture of trust in the organization and an appropriate information and communication system. The aim of these activities is to save control costs, that become redundant when employees act independently and in a self-motivated fashion. In the book Empowerment Takes More Than a Minute, the authors illustrate three keys that organizations can use to open the knowledge, experience, and motivation power that people already have. The three keys that managers must use to empower their employees are:

1. Share information with everyone
2. Create autonomy through boundaries
3. Replace the old hierarchy with self-directed work teams

According to Stewart, in order to guarantee a successful work environment, managers need to exercise the "right kind of authority" (p. 6). To summarize, "empowerment is simply the effective use of a manager's authority", and subsequently, it is a productive way to maximize all-around work efficiency.

Implementing these elements can be difficult, and achieving workplace empowerment is often a gradual process. Organizations may need to train employees and build their confidence that empowerment will benefit the company.

=== Criticisms ===
The implementation of the concept of empowerment in management has been criticized for failing to live up to its claims. American philosopher Joanne Ciulla discusses the issue of bogus empowerment.

== In artificial intelligence ==
Empowerment in the study of artificial intelligence is an information-theoretic quantity that measures the perceived capacity of an agent to influence its environment. Empowerment is an approach to modelling intrinsic motivation where advantageous actions are chosen by agent with just knowledge of the structure of the environment, rather than satisfying an externally imposed need as in homeostasis.

Experiments have shown that artificial agents acting to maximise their empowerment, in the absence of a defined goal, exhibit advantageous exploratory behaviour that, in a range of simulated environments, resembles intelligent behaviour in living things.

== "Age of Popular Empowerment" ==
Marshall McLuhan insisted that the development of electronic media would eventually weaken the hierarchical structures that underpin central governments, large corporation, academia and, more generally, rigid, "linear-Cartesian" forms of social organization. From that perspective, new, "electronic forms of awareness" driven by information technology would empower citizen, employees and students by disseminating in near-real-time vast amounts of information once reserved to a small number of experts and specialists. Citizens would be bound to ask for substantially more say in the management of government affairs, production, consumption, and education

World Pensions Council (WPC) economist Nicolas Firzli has argued that rapidly rising cultural tides, notably new forms of online engagement and increased demands for ESG-driven public policies and managerial decisions are transforming the way governments and corporation interact with citizen-consumers in the "Age of Empowerment"

== See also ==
- Citizen Science
- Decentralization
- Delegation
- Learned helplessness
- Learned optimism
- Popular education
- Self-help
- Capacity building
- Positive psychology
- Self-ownership
- Employee engagement
- Power (social and political)
- Youth empowerment
- Black economic empowerment
- Angela Rose
- Minority rights
- Women's rights
- Gender empowerment
- Legal awareness
- Legal mobilisation
