= Jacqueline Gottlieb =

American neuroscientist and academic

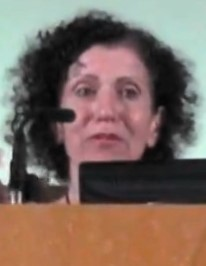
- Gottlieb in 2016
- Education: Yale University; Massachusetts Institute of Technology
- Scientific career
- Workplaces: National Institutes of Health; Uniformed Services University of the Health Sciences; Columbia University
- Thesis: Contributions of the frontal eye field to smooth pursuit eye movements (1993)

Jacqueline Gottlieb is an American neuroscientist who is a professor of neuroscience and the Principal Investigator at the Columbia University Zuckerman Institute. Her research considers the mechanisms that underlie cognitive function.

== Early life and education ==
Gottileb was born in Romania and moved to Israel as a child. She moved to the United States for undergraduate studies at Massachusetts Institute of Technology, where she studied cognitive neuroscience. She moved to Yale University for doctoral research in neurobiology, and became fascinated by the frontal cortex. Gottileb used neural recordings to investigate frontal eye fields and smooth pursuit eye movements. Such movements are slow movements that are designed to keep eyes fixed on an object that moves. After earning her doctorate, Gottileb moved to Uniformed Services University of the Health Sciences in Maryland, where she worked on in vitro slice recordings in the barrel cortex. She spent two years at the University of Health Sciences before joining the National Institutes of Health.

== Research and career ==
In 2001, Gottileb joined the faculty at Columbia University. She studies the fundamental mechanisms that underpin cognitive function, such as decision making and memory. She is interested in how the brain gathers evidence during everyday tasks and when people are curious, as well as disorders that reduce attention, such as depression and drug addiction. In 2019, she was made Director of the Research Cluster on Curiosity, which looks to examine the mechanisms and impacts of curiosity.

== Awards and honors ==
- 2014 McKnight Foundation Memory and Cognitive Disorders Award
- 2015 The Center for Science & Society at Columbia University Presidential Scholars in Society and Neuroscience

== Selected publications ==
- J. P. Gottlieb; M. Kusunoki; M. E. Goldberg (January 1, 1998). "The representation of visual salience in monkey parietal cortex" (PDF). Nature. 391 (6666): 481–484. doi:10.1038/35135. ISSN 1476-4687. PMID 9461214. Wikidata Q48536671.
- Jacqueline Gottlieb; Pierre-Yves Oudeyer; Manuel Lopes; Adrien Baranes (October 12, 2013). "Information-seeking, curiosity, and attention: computational and neural mechanisms". Trends in Cognitive Sciences. 17 (11): 585–593. doi:10.1016/j.tics.2013.09.001. ISSN 1364-6613. PMC 4193662. PMID 24126129. Wikidata Q38152578.
- Jacqueline Gottlieb (January 1, 2007). "From thought to action: the parietal cortex as a bridge between perception, action, and cognition". Neuron. 53 (1): 9–16. doi:10.1016/j.neuron.2006.12.009. ISSN 0896-6273. PMID 17196526. Wikidata Q36695674.
