= Pierre-Yves Oudeyer =

French roboticist (born 1977)

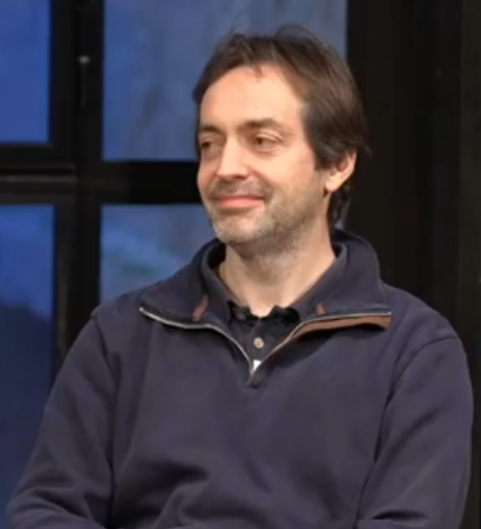
- In a 2025 interview
- Born: 17 December 1977 (age 48); France
- Education: ENS Lyon; Pierre and Marie Curie University
- Scientific career
- Fields: Robotics Cognitive Robotics Artificial Intelligence
- Institutions: Sony; University of Bordeaux; INRIA
- Thesis: L' auto-organisation de la parole (2003)
- Doctoral advisor: Luc Steels; Jean-Pierre Briot
- Website: www.pyoudeyer.com

Pierre-Yves Oudeyer (born 17 December 1977) is a French roboticist and artificial intelligence researcher. He is currently Research Director at the French Institute for Research in Computer Science and Automation (INRIA) and head of the Inria and ENSTA ParisTech FLOWERS team. Before, he has been a permanent researcher in Sony Computer Science Laboratory from 1999 to 2007.

== Education and career ==
Oudeyer studied theoretical computer science at Ecole Normale Supérieure in Lyon, and received his Ph.D. degree in artificial intelligence from the University Paris VI, France. After working on computational models of language evolution, he is now working on developmental and social robotics, focusing on sensorimotor development, language acquisition and lifelong learning in robots. Strongly inspired by infant development, the mechanisms he studies include artificial curiosity, intrinsic motivation, the role of morphology in learning motor control, human-robot interfaces, joint attention and joint intentional understanding, and imitation learning. He has published a book, more than 80 papers in international journals and conferences, holds 8 patents, gave several invited keynote lectures in international conferences, and received several prizes for his work in developmental robotics and on the origins of language. In particular, he is laureate of the ERC Starting Grant EXPLORERS.

Oudeyer is editor of the IEEE CIS Newsletter on Autonomous Mental Development, and associate editor of IEEE Transactions on Autonomous Mental Development, Frontiers in Neurorobotics, and of the International Journal of Social Robotics. He is also working actively for the diffusion of science towards the general public, through the writing of popular science articles and participation to radio and TV programs as well as science exhibitions.

Oudeyer is inventor or co-inventor of over 15 patents covering 5 different technological issues. He received a number of awards for his thesis and certain publications.
