= Kidnapped robot problem =

In robotics, the kidnapped robot problem is the situation where an autonomous robot in operation is carried to an arbitrary location.

The kidnapped robot problem creates significant issues with the robot's localization system, and only a subset of localization algorithms can successfully deal with the uncertainty created; it is commonly used to test a robot's ability to recover from catastrophic localization failures.

== See also ==
- Exploration problem
- Wake-up robot problem
