= Motor babbling =

Speech of babbling from motor

Motor babbling is a process of repeatedly performing a random motor command for a short duration. It is similar to the vocal babbling of infants, where the brain learns the relation between vocal muscle activities and the resulting sounds. However, it was found that the general motor-control system is already exploring itself in the womb, in animals, in a similar way. Originally, the random spasms and convulsions of the embryo were seen as the non-functional consequences of growth. Later it was realized that the motor system is already calibrating its sensorimotor system before birth. After birth, motor babbling in primates continues in the random grasping movements towards visual targets, training the hand–eye coordination system. These insights are used since the early nineteen nineties in models of biological movement control and in robotics. In robotics, it is a system of robot learning whereby a robotic system can autonomously develop an internal model of its self-body and its environment. Early work is by Kuperstein (1991) using a robot randomly positioning a stick in its workspace, while being observed by two cameras, using a neural network (multilayer perceptron) to associate poses of the stick with joint angles of the arm. This type of research has led to the research field of developmental robotics.

The random exploration of the motor-control state and its effects can lead to the identification of parameters for a inverse kinematics and inverse dynamics model, which the robot can use to find appropriate control signals, given a particular task that requires positioning and/or force control.

== See also ==
- Kinesiology
- Central pattern generator
- Curiosity
- Phantom limb
