= Evolutionary developmental robotics =

Evolutionary developmental robotics (evo-devo-robo for short) refers to methodologies that systematically integrate evolutionary robotics, epigenetic robotics and morphogenetic robotics to study the evolution, physical and mental development and learning of natural intelligent systems in robotic systems. The field was formally suggested and fully discussed in a published paper and further discussed in a published dialogue.

The theoretical foundation of evo-devo-robo includes evolutionary developmental biology (evo-devo), evolutionary developmental psychology, developmental cognitive neuroscience etc. Further discussions on evolution, development and learning in robotics and design can be found in a number of papers, including papers on hardware systems and computing tissues.

== See also ==
- Artificial life
- Cognitive robotics
- Morphogenetic robotics
- Developmental robotics
- Evolutionary robotics
