= Wake-up robot problem =

In robotics, the wake-up robot problem refers to a situation where an autonomous robot is carried to an arbitrary location and put to operation, and the robot must localize itself without any prior knowledge.

The wake-up robot problem is closely related to the kidnapped robot problem.

== See also ==
- Exploration problem
- Simultaneous localization and mapping
