= Cognitive robotics =

Subfield of robotics

Cognitive robotics or cognitive technology is a subfield of robotics concerned with endowing a robot with intelligent behavior by providing it with a processing architecture that will allow it to learn and reason about how to behave in response to complex goals in a complex world. Cognitive robotics may be considered the engineering branch of embodied cognitive science and embodied embedded cognition, consisting of robotic process automation, artificial intelligence, machine learning, deep learning, optical character recognition, image processing, process mining, analytics, software development and system integration.

== Core issues ==
While traditional cognitive modeling approaches have assumed symbolic coding schemes as a means for depicting the world, translating the world into these kinds of symbolic representations has proven to be problematic if not untenable. Perception and action and the notion of symbolic representation are therefore core issues to be addressed in cognitive robotics.

== Starting point ==
Cognitive robotics views human or animal cognition as a starting point for the development of robotic information processing, as opposed to more traditional artificial intelligence techniques. Target robotic cognitive capabilities include perception processing, attention allocation, anticipation, planning, complex motor coordination, reasoning about other agents and perhaps even about their own mental states. Robotic cognition embodies the behavior of intelligent agents in the physical world (or a virtual world, in the case of simulated cognitive robotics). Ultimately, the robot must be able to act in the real world.

== Learning techniques ==
=== Motor Babble ===
A preliminary robot learning technique called motor babbling involves correlating pseudo-random complex motor movements by the robot with resulting visual and/or auditory feedback such that the robot may begin to expect a pattern of sensory feedback given a pattern of motor output. Desired sensory feedback may then be used to inform a motor control signal. This is thought to be analogous to how a baby learns to reach for objects or learns to produce speech sounds. For simpler robot systems, where, for instance, inverse kinematics may feasibly be used to transform anticipated feedback (desired motor result) into motor output, this step may be skipped.

=== Imitation ===
Once a robot can coordinate its motors to produce a desired result, the technique of learning by imitation may be used. The robot monitors the performance of another agent and then the robot tries to imitate that agent. It is often a challenge to transform imitation information from a complex scene into a desired motor result for the robot. Note that imitation is a high-level form of cognitive behavior and imitation is not necessarily required in a basic model of embodied animal cognition.

=== Knowledge acquisition ===
A more complex learning approach is "autonomous knowledge acquisition": the robot is left to explore the environment on its own. A system of goals and beliefs is typically assumed.

A somewhat more directed mode of exploration can be achieved by "curiosity" algorithms, such as Intelligent Adaptive Curiosity or Category-Based Intrinsic Motivation. These algorithms generally involve breaking sensory input into a finite number of categories and assigning some sort of prediction system (such as an artificial neural network) to each. The prediction system keeps track of the error in its predictions over time. Reduction in prediction error is considered learning. The robot then preferentially explores categories in which it is learning (or reducing prediction error) the fastest.

== Other architectures ==
Some researchers in cognitive robotics have tried using architectures such as (ACT-R and Soar (cognitive architecture)) as a basis for their cognitive robotics programs. These highly modular symbol-processing architectures have been used to simulate operator performance and human performance when modeling simplistic and symbolized laboratory data. The idea is to extend these architectures to handle real-world sensory input as that input continuously unfolds through time. What is needed is a way to somehow translate the world into a set of symbols and their relationships.

== See also ==
- Artificial intelligence
- AI effect
- Intelligent agent
- Cognitive architecture
- Cognitive science
- Cybernetics
- Developmental robotics
- Embodied cognitive science
- Epigenetic robotics
- Evolutionary robotics
- Hybrid intelligent system
- iCub
- Intelligent control

== Sources ==
- The Symbolic and Subsymbolic Robotic Intelligence Control System (SS-RICS)
- Intelligent Systems Group - University of Utrecht
- The Cognitive Robotics Group - University of Toronto
- The IDSIA Robotics Lab and Cognitive Robotics Lab of Juergen Schmidhuber
- What Does the Future Hold for Cognitive Robots? - Idaho National Laboratory
- Cognitive Robotics at the Naval Research Laboratory
- Cognitive robotics at ENSTA autonomous embodied systems, evolving in complex and non-constraint environments, using mainly vision as sensor.
- The Center for Intelligent Systems - Vanderbilt University
- Institute for Cognition and Robotics (CoR-Lab) at Bielefeld University
- SocioCognitive Robotics at Delft University of Technology
- Autonomous Systems Laboratory at Universidad Politecnica de Madrid
- Knowledge Technology at Universität Hamburg
- The Cognitive Robotics Association, founded in 1998, directed by Gerhard Lakemeyer, University of Aachen, organizes every two years the Cognitive Robotics Workshop and it is generously supported by the AI journal
