= Plectics =

Plectics (from Greek πλεκτός plektos, "woven") is the name that Murray Gell-Mann, a Nobel Laureate in Physics, has suggested for the research area described by Gell-Mann as "a broad transdisciplinary subject covering aspects of simplicity and complexity as well as the properties of complex adaptive systems, including composite complex adaptive systems consisting of many adaptive agents".

== Etymology ==
Murray Gell-Mann explains the derivation of the word as follows:

It is important, in my opinion, for the name to connect with both simplicity and complexity. What is most exciting about our work is that it illuminates the chain of connections between, on the one hand, the simple underlying laws that govern the behavior of all matter in the universe and, on the other hand, the complex fabric that we see around us, exhibiting diversity, individuality, and evolution. The interplay between simplicity and complexity is the heart of our subject.

It is interesting to note, therefore, that the two words are related. The Indo-European root *plek- gives rise to the Latin verb plicare, to fold, which yields simplex, literally once folded, from which our English word "simple" derives. But *plek- likewise gives the Latin past participle plexus, braided or entwined, from which is derived complexus, literally braided together, responsible for the English word "complex." The Greek equivalent to plexus is πλεκτος (plektos), yielding the mathematical term "symplectic," which also has the literal meaning braided together, but comes to English from Greek rather than Latin.

The name that I propose for our subject is "plectics," derived, like mathematics, ethics, politics, economics, and so on, from the Greek. Since plektos with no prefix comes from *plek-, but without any commitment to the notion of "once" as in "simple" or to the notion of "together" as in "complex," the derived word "plectics" can cover both simplicity and complexity.

== See also ==
- Computational cybernetics
- Santa Fe Institute
