= Model-free (reinforcement learning) =

Class of reinforcement learning algorithm

In reinforcement learning (RL), a model-free algorithm is an algorithm which does not estimate the transition probability distribution (and the reward function) associated with the Markov decision process (MDP), which, in RL, represents the problem to be solved. The transition probability distribution (or transition model) and the reward function are often collectively called the "model" of the environment (or MDP), hence the name "model-free". A model-free RL algorithm can be thought of as an "explicit" trial-and-error algorithm. Typical examples of model-free algorithms include Monte Carlo (MC) RL, SARSA, and Q-learning.

Monte Carlo estimation is a central component of many model-free RL algorithms. The MC learning algorithm is essentially an important branch of generalized policy iteration, which has two periodically alternating steps: policy evaluation (PEV) and policy improvement (PIM). In this framework, each policy is first evaluated by its corresponding value function. Then, based on the evaluation result, greedy search is completed to produce a better policy. The MC estimation is mainly applied to the first step of policy evaluation. The simplest idea is used to judge the effectiveness of the current policy, which is to average the returns of all collected samples. As more experience is accumulated, the estimate will converge to the true value by the law of large numbers. Hence, MC policy evaluation does not require any prior knowledge of the environment dynamics. Instead, only experience is needed (i.e., samples of state, action, and reward), which is generated from interacting with an environment (which may be real or simulated).

Value function estimation is crucial for model-free RL algorithms. Unlike MC methods, temporal difference (TD) methods learn this function by reusing existing value estimates. TD learning has the ability to learn from an incomplete sequence of events without waiting for the final outcome. It can also approximate the future return as a function of the current state. Similar to MC, TD only uses experience to estimate the value function without knowing any prior knowledge of the environment dynamics. The advantage of TD lies in the fact that it can update the value function based on its current estimate. Therefore, TD learning algorithms can learn from incomplete episodes or continuing tasks in a step-by-step manner, while MC must be implemented in an episode-by-episode fashion.

== Model-free reinforcement learning algorithms ==
Model-free RL algorithms can start from a blank policy candidate and achieve human-level or superhuman performance in many complex tasks, including Atari games, StarCraft and Go. Deep neural networks can be combined with RL to create agents that outperform humans, such as Google DeepMind's AlphaGo, which defeated a human world champion at Go. Mainstream model-free RL algorithms include Deep Q-Network (DQN), Dueling DQN, Double DQN (DDQN), Trust Region Policy Optimization (TRPO), Proximal Policy Optimization (PPO), Asynchronous Advantage Actor-Critic (A3C), Deep Deterministic Policy Gradient (DDPG), Twin Delayed DDPG (TD3), Soft Actor-Critic (SAC), Distributional Soft Actor-Critic (DSAC), etc. Some model-free (deep) RL algorithms are listed as follows:

Algorithm	Description	Policy	Action Space	State Space	Operator
DQN	Deep Q Network	Off-policy	Discrete	Typically Discrete or Continuous	Q-value
DDPG	Deep Deterministic Policy Gradient	Off-policy	Continuous	Discrete or Continuous	Q-value
A3C	Asynchronous Advantage Actor-Critic Algorithm	On-policy	Continuous	Discrete or Continuous	Advantage
TRPO	Trust Region Policy Optimization	On-policy	Continuous or Discrete	Discrete or Continuous	Advantage
PPO	Proximal Policy Optimization	On-policy	Continuous or Discrete	Discrete or Continuous	Advantage
TD3	Twin Delayed Deep Deterministic Policy Gradient	Off-policy	Continuous	Continuous	Q-value
SAC	Soft Actor-Critic	Off-policy	Continuous	Discrete or Continuous	Advantage
DSAC	Distributional Soft Actor-Critic	Off-policy	Continuous	Continuous	Value distribution
