= Sparrow (chatbot) =

Chatbot by DeepMind

- Sparrow answers a question and follow-up question using evidence.
- Developer: DeepMind
- Available in: English
- Type: Chatbot

Sparrow is a chatbot developed by the artificial intelligence research lab DeepMind, a subsidiary of Alphabet Inc. It is designed to answer users' questions correctly, while reducing the risk of unsafe and inappropriate answers. One motivation behind Sparrow is to address the problem of language models producing incorrect, biased or potentially harmful outputs. Sparrow is trained using human judgements, in order to be more “Helpful, Correct and Harmless” compared to baseline pre-trained language models. The development of Sparrow involved asking paid study participants to interact with Sparrow, and collecting their preferences to train a model of how useful an answer is.

To improve accuracy and help avoid the problem of hallucinating incorrect answers, Sparrow has the ability to search the Internet using Google Search in order to find and cite evidence for any factual claims it makes.

To make the model safer, its behaviour is constrained by a set of rules, for example "don't make threatening statements" and "don't make hateful or insulting comments", as well as rules about possibly harmful advice, and not claiming to be a person. During development study participants were asked to converse with the system and try to trick it into breaking these rules. A 'rule model' was trained on judgements from these participants, which was used for further training.

Sparrow was introduced in a paper in September 2022, titled "Improving alignment of dialogue agents via targeted human judgements"; however, the bot was not released publicly. In January 2023, DeepMind CEO Demis Hassabis said DeepMind was considering releasing Sparrow for a "private beta" some time in 2023.

== Training ==
Sparrow is a deep neural network based on the transformer machine learning model architecture. It is fine-tuned from DeepMind's Chinchilla pre-trained large language model (LLM), which has 70 billion parameters.

Sparrow is trained using reinforcement learning from human feedback (RLHF), although some supervised fine-tuning techniques are also used. The RLHF training utilizes two reward models to capture human judgements: a “preference model” that predicts what a human study participant would prefer and a “rule model” that predicts if the model has broken one of the rules.

== Limitations ==
DeepMind's initial research on Sparrow focused on an English-speaking agent. The company said more work was needed to get similar results in other languages and cultural contexts.

When adversarially probed by study participants it breaks the rules 8% of the time; however, this is still three times lower than the baseline prompted pre-trained model (Chinchilla).

== See also ==
- AI safety
- Commonsense reasoning
- Ethics of artificial intelligence
- Natural language processing
- Prompt engineering
