= THEMATICS =

Bioinformatics method

Theoretical Microscopic Anomalous Titration Curve Shapes (THEMATICS) is a computational method for predicting the biochemically active amino acids in a protein three-dimensional structure.

The method was developed by Mary Jo Ondrechen, James Clifton, and Dagmar Ringe. It is based on computed electrostatic and chemical properties of the individual amino acids in a protein structure. Specifically it identifies anomalous shapes in the theoretical titration curves of the ionizable amino acids. Biochemically active amino acids tend to have wide buffer ranges and non-sigmoidal titration patterns.

While the method predicts biochemically active amino acids successfully, it also provides input features to a machine learning predictor, Partial Order Optimum Likelihood (POOL).
