= Mary Jo Ondrechen =

American chemist and educator

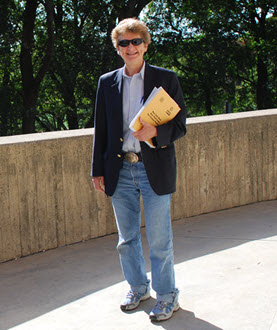
- Ondrechen on the campus of Brandeis University in 2011
- Born: 1953 (age 72–73)
- Education: Reed College (BS); Northwestern University (PhD)
- Scientific career
- Fields: theoretical chemistry
- Workplaces: Northeastern University
- Doctoral advisor: Mark A. Ratner

Mary Jo Ondrechen (born 1953) is an American chemist, educator, researcher, community leader and activist. She is a professor of chemistry and chemical biology and principal investigator of the computational biology research group at Northeastern University in Boston, Massachusetts.

== Education ==
Ondrechen received an American Chemical Society certified bachelor's degree in chemistry from Reed College, Portland, Oregon, in 1974. She pursued doctoral studies in chemistry and chemical physics at Northwestern University, Evanston, Illinois, and earned the Ph.D. degree in 1978 under the direction of Mark A. Ratner. After postdoctoral research appointments at the University of Chicago and at Tel-Aviv University in Israel, the latter as a NATO postdoctoral fellow, she joined the faculty at Northeastern University in Boston, Massachusetts in 1980.

== Research and discoveries ==
Her earlier research achievements include the design of molecules and materials with desirable spectroscopic and conductive properties, prediction of electric field effects in molecules and proteins, the optimization of energy conversion devices, and the design and characterization of ionic conductor materials for rechargeable batteries. Her current research activities include modeling of biological macromolecules and predictive calculations for functional genomics.

She co-developed THEMATICS (Theoretical Microscopic Anomalous Titration Curve Shapes), a computational predictor of functional information about proteins from their three-dimensional structure alone. THEMATICS predicts catalytic and binding sites in proteins with high sensitivity and good selectivity. A unique feature of THEMATICS is that it requires neither sequence nor structural comparisons and hence applies to novel folds, orphan sequences, and also to engineered polypeptide systems.

She is also the co-developer, with Wenxu Tong and Ronald J. Williams, of a machine learning technology called Partial Order Optimum Likelihood (POOL). POOL is a monotonicity-constrained maximum likelihood method for the prediction of properties that depend monotonically on the input features. This method, coupled with THEMATICS input features, is a top-performing active site predictor for protein structures.

These methods are also being used for the successful annotation of structural genomics proteins, i.e. for the discovery of the function of gene products whose function is currently unknown. Her Structurally Aligned Local Sites of Activity (SALSA) method uses local sets of amino acid residues that are computationally predicted to be active in catalysis to identify the biochemical function of enzyme structures of unknown function.

These computational methods are also currently used to understand how enzymes affect catalysis. Ondrechen has emphasized and developed the concept of spatially extended enzyme active sites, and that the participation of amino acids, even if they are distant from the site of the catalyzed reaction, may be predicted with a relatively simple calculation.

Her research group has also developed computational methods to improve the design of artificial enzymes.

In 2020 Ondrechen's research group added a new project to characterize the proteins of SARS-CoV-2, the virus that causes COVID-19, and to seek interventions to disrupt the viral life cycle

She was the 2024 recipient of the Technical Excellence Award of AISES and the 2026 Lifetime Mentoring Award of the American Association for the Advancement of Science (AAAS)

== Community activism ==
Ondrechen is a community leader and activist. She has recently served on the board of advisors of the Washington, D.C.–based Interstate Technology and Regulatory Council (ITRC), representing the interests of community and tribal stakeholders. She is the former president of the board of directors of the North American Indian Center of Boston (NAICOB) and served as chair of the board of directors of the Albuquerque, New Mexico-based American Indian Science and Engineering Society (AISES) from 2011 to 2013. An advocate for stewardship of the Earth, she previously has served on the Conservation Commission for Hopkinton, Massachusetts, and on the Community Leaders Network of the U.S. Department of Energy. She has been active in the promotion of innovative technologies to solve environmental problems. She also advocates for the inclusion of public and tribal stakeholders in environmental evaluation, decision-making, and management.

She was a speaker at the March for Science in Washington, D.C. in April 2017.

She has given numerous presentations on diversity and inclusiveness in the science, technology, engineering, and mathematics (STEM) fields.
