= Actor-critic algorithm =

Reinforcement learning algorithms

The actor-critic algorithm (AC) is a family of reinforcement learning (RL) algorithms that combine policy-based RL algorithms such as policy gradient methods, and value-based RL algorithms such as value iteration, Q-learning, SARSA, and TD learning.

An AC algorithm consists of two main components: an "actor" that determines which actions to take according to a policy function, and a "critic" that evaluates those actions according to a value function. Some AC algorithms are on-policy, some are off-policy. Some apply to either continuous or discrete action spaces. Some work in both cases.

== Overview ==
The actor-critic methods can be understood as an improvement over pure policy gradient methods like REINFORCE via introducing a baseline.

=== Actor ===
The actor uses a policy function $\pi(a|s)$, while the critic estimates either the value function $V(s)$, the action-value Q-function $Q(s,a),$ the advantage function $A(s,a)$, or any combination thereof.

The actor is a parameterized function $\pi_\theta$, where $\theta$ are the parameters of the actor. The actor takes as argument the state of the environment $s$ and produces a probability distribution $\pi_\theta(\cdot | s)$.

If the action space is discrete, then $\sum_{a} \pi_\theta(a | s) = 1$. If the action space is continuous, then $\int_{a} \pi_\theta(a | s) da = 1$.

The goal of policy optimization is to improve the actor. That is, to find some $\theta$ that maximizes the expected episodic reward $J(\theta)$:
$$J(\theta) = \mathbb{E}_{\pi_\theta}\left[\sum_{t=0}^{T} \gamma^t r_t\right]$$
where $\gamma$ is the discount factor, $r_t$ is the reward at step $t$, and $T$ is the time-horizon (which can be infinite).

The goal of policy gradient method is to optimize $J(\theta)$ by gradient ascent on the policy gradient $\nabla J(\theta)$.

As detailed on the policy gradient method page, there are many unbiased estimators of the policy gradient:
$$\nabla_\theta J(\theta) = \mathbb{E}_{\pi_\theta}\left[\sum_{0\leq j \leq T}  \nabla_\theta\ln\pi_\theta(A_j| S_j)
\cdot \Psi_j
\Big|S_0 = s_0 \right]$$
where $\Psi_j$ is a linear sum of the following:

- $\sum_{0 \leq i\leq T} (\gamma^i R_i)$.
- $\gamma^j\sum_{j \leq i\leq T} (\gamma^{i-j} R_i)$: the REINFORCE algorithm.
- $\gamma^j \sum_{j \leq i\leq T} (\gamma^{i-j} R_i) - b(S_j)$: the REINFORCE with baseline algorithm. Here $b$ is an arbitrary function.
- $\gamma^j \left(R_j + \gamma V^{\pi_\theta}( S_{j+1}) - V^{\pi_\theta}( S_{j})\right)$: TD(1) learning.
- $\gamma^j Q^{\pi_\theta}(S_j, A_j)$.
- $\gamma^j A^{\pi_\theta}(S_j, A_j)$: Advantage Actor-Critic (A2C).
- $\gamma^j \left(R_j + \gamma R_{j+1} + \gamma^2 V^{\pi_\theta}( S_{j+2}) - V^{\pi_\theta}( S_{j})\right)$: TD(2) learning.
- $\gamma^j \left(\sum_{k=0}^{n-1} \gamma^k R_{j+k} + \gamma^n V^{\pi_\theta}( S_{j+n}) - V^{\pi_\theta}( S_{j})\right)$: TD(n) learning.
- $\gamma^j \sum_{n=1}^\infty \frac{\lambda^{n-1}}{1-\lambda}\cdot \left(\sum_{k=0}^{n-1} \gamma^k R_{j+k} + \gamma^n V^{\pi_\theta}( S_{j+n}) - V^{\pi_\theta}( S_{j})\right)$: TD(λ) learning, also known as GAE (generalized advantage estimate). This is obtained by an exponentially decaying sum of the TD(n) learning terms.

=== Critic ===
In the unbiased estimators given above, certain functions such as $V^{\pi_\theta}, Q^{\pi_\theta}, A^{\pi_\theta}$ appear. These are approximated by the critic. Since these functions all depend on the actor, the critic must learn alongside the actor. The critic is learned by value-based RL algorithms.

For example, if the critic is estimating the state-value function $V^{\pi_\theta}(s)$, then it can be learned by any value function approximation method. Let the critic be a function approximator $V_\phi(s)$ with parameters $\phi$.

The simplest example is TD(1) learning, which trains the critic to minimize the TD(1) error:
$$\delta_i = R_i + \gamma V_\phi(S_{i+1}) - V_\phi(S_i)$$
The critic parameters are updated by gradient descent on the squared TD error:
$$\phi \leftarrow \phi - \alpha  \nabla_\phi (\delta_i)^2 = \phi + \alpha \delta_i \nabla_\phi V_\phi(S_i)$$
where $\alpha$ is the learning rate. Note that the gradient is taken with respect to the $\phi$ in $V_\phi(S_i)$ only, since the $\phi$ in $\gamma V_\phi(S_{i+1})$ constitutes a moving target, and the gradient is not taken with respect to that. This is a common source of error in implementations that use automatic differentiation, and requires "stopping the gradient" at that point.

Similarly, if the critic is estimating the action-value function $Q^{\pi_\theta}$, then it can be learned by Q-learning or SARSA. In SARSA, the critic maintains an estimate of the Q-function, parameterized by $\phi$, denoted as $Q_\phi(s, a)$. The temporal difference error is then calculated as $\delta_i = R_i + \gamma Q_\theta(S_{i+1}, A_{i+1}) - Q_\theta(S_i,A_i)$. The critic is then updated by
$$\theta \leftarrow \theta + \alpha \delta_i \nabla_\theta Q_\theta(S_i, A_i)$$
The advantage critic can be trained by training both a Q-function $Q_\phi(s,a)$ and a state-value function $V_\phi(s)$, then let $A_\phi(s,a) = Q_\phi(s,a) - V_\phi(s)$. Although, it is more common to train just a state-value function $V_\phi(s)$, then estimate the advantage by
$$A_\phi(S_i,A_i) \approx \sum_{j\in 0:n-1} \gamma^{j}R_{i+j} + \gamma^{n}V_\phi(S_{i+n}) - V_\phi(S_i)$$
Here, $n$ is a positive integer. The higher $n$ is, the more lower is the bias in the advantage estimation, but at the price of higher variance.

The Generalized Advantage Estimation (GAE) introduces a hyperparameter $\lambda$ that smoothly interpolates between Monte Carlo returns ($\lambda = 1$, high variance, no bias) and 1-step TD learning ($\lambda = 0$, low variance, high bias). This hyperparameter can be adjusted to pick the optimal bias-variance trade-off in advantage estimation. It uses an exponentially decaying average of n-step returns with $\lambda$ being the decay strength.

== Variants ==
- Asynchronous Advantage Actor-Critic (A3C): Parallel and asynchronous version of A2C.
- Soft Actor-Critic (SAC): Incorporates entropy maximization for improved exploration.
- Deep Deterministic Policy Gradient (DDPG): Specialized for continuous action spaces.

== See also ==
- Reinforcement learning
- Policy gradient method
- Deep reinforcement learning
