= IBM Think =

IBM Think may refer to:

- Think (slogan), company slogan of IBM
- Think conference, an annual business conference organized by IBM
