= IBM Watson Studio =

Software platform for data science

Watsonx.ai Studio (formerly IBM Watson Studio and, previously, Data Science Experience, or DSX), is IBM’s software platform for data science. The IBM Watsonx platform consists of the studio, a data store and a governance toolkit; its workspace includes multiple collaboration and open-source tools for use in data science.

In Watson.ai Studio, a data scientist can create a project with a group of collaborators, all having access to various analytics models and using various languages (R/Python/Scala). Watson.ai Studio brings together staple open source tools including RStudio, Spark and Python in an integrated environment, along with additional tools such as a managed Spark service and data shaping facilities, in a secure and governed environment.

Watson.ai Studio provides access to data sets that are available through Watson Data Platform, on-premises, or on the cloud, and collaborates with Hugging Face to provide its open models and datasets. The platform also has embedded resources such as articles on the latest developments from the data science world and public data sets, and is available in on-premise, cloud, and desktop forms.

== History ==
IBM announced the launch of Data Science Experience at the Spark Summit 2016 in San Francisco. IBM invested $300 million in efforts to make Spark the analytics operating system for all of its big data efforts.

In June 2017, Hortonworks and IBM announced their partnership to collaborate on IBM's Data Science Experience. Hortonworks previously had a partnership relationship with Microsoft.

An official partnership with Anaconda to integrate Anaconda Team Edition with the Watson Studio on IBM Cloud Pak for Data was formed in 2020. In 2024, the IBM watsonx.ai platform was also embedded with Anaconda Python packages. The company extended its collaboration with Hugging Face in 2023.

=== Name changes ===
In 2018, the Data Science Experience platform was renamed IBM Watson Studio. Watson Studio was again rebranded, in 2023, to watsonx.ai Studio.
