= Think (slogan) =

Slogan used by IBM

THINK
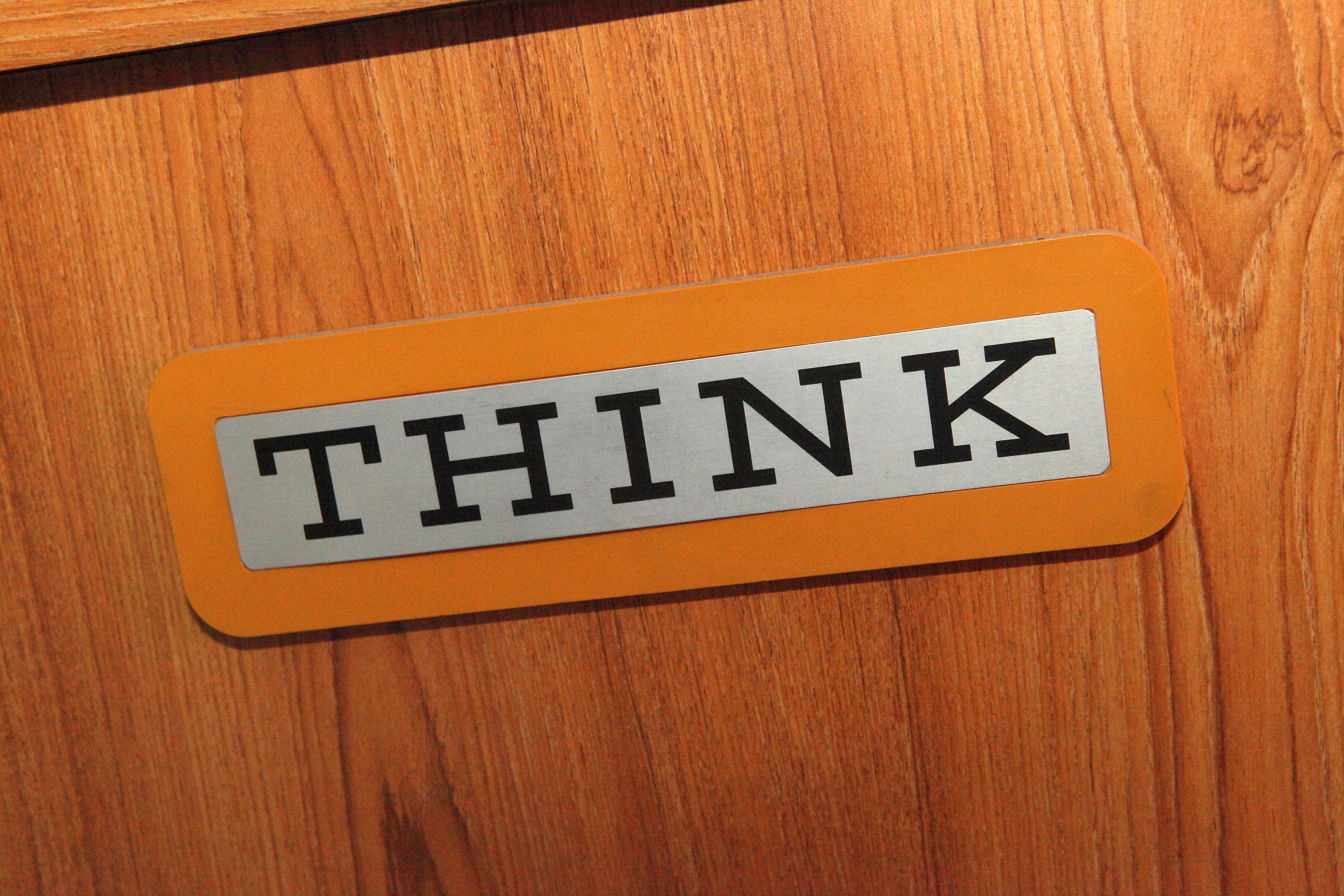
- IBM Think sign
- Product: Information technology
- Release date: 1911

"THINK"
Thomas J. Watson, who led IBM from 1914 to 1956, discussing the company's motto "THINK"

"Think" (stylized as THINK) is a slogan associated with the American multinational technology company IBM.

== History ==
The "THINK" slogan was first used by Thomas J. Watson in December 1911, while managing the sales and advertising departments at the National Cash Register Company. At an uninspiring sales meeting, Watson interrupted, saying "The trouble with every one of us is that we don't think enough. We don't get paid for working with our feet – we get paid for working with our heads". Watson then wrote THINK on the easel.

Asked later what he meant by the slogan, Watson replied, "By THINK I mean take everything into consideration. I refuse to make the sign more specific. If a man just sees THINK, he'll find out what I mean. We're not interested in a logic course."

In 1914, Watson took the slogan with him to the Computing-Tabulating-Recording Company (CTR) and its subsidiaries, all of which later became IBM. International Time Recording, one of the subsidiaries, published a magazine for employees and customers, named Time, which, in 1935, IBM would rename to THINK. IBM continues to use the slogan. THINK is also an IBM trademark; IBM named its laptop computers ThinkPads and named a line of business-oriented desktop computers ThinkCentre and the monitors ThinkVision.

Since 2018, IBM's main conference is called IBM Think.

The Apple slogan "Think different," meaning "Think differently", first used in 1997, has been widely taken as a response to IBM's THINK.

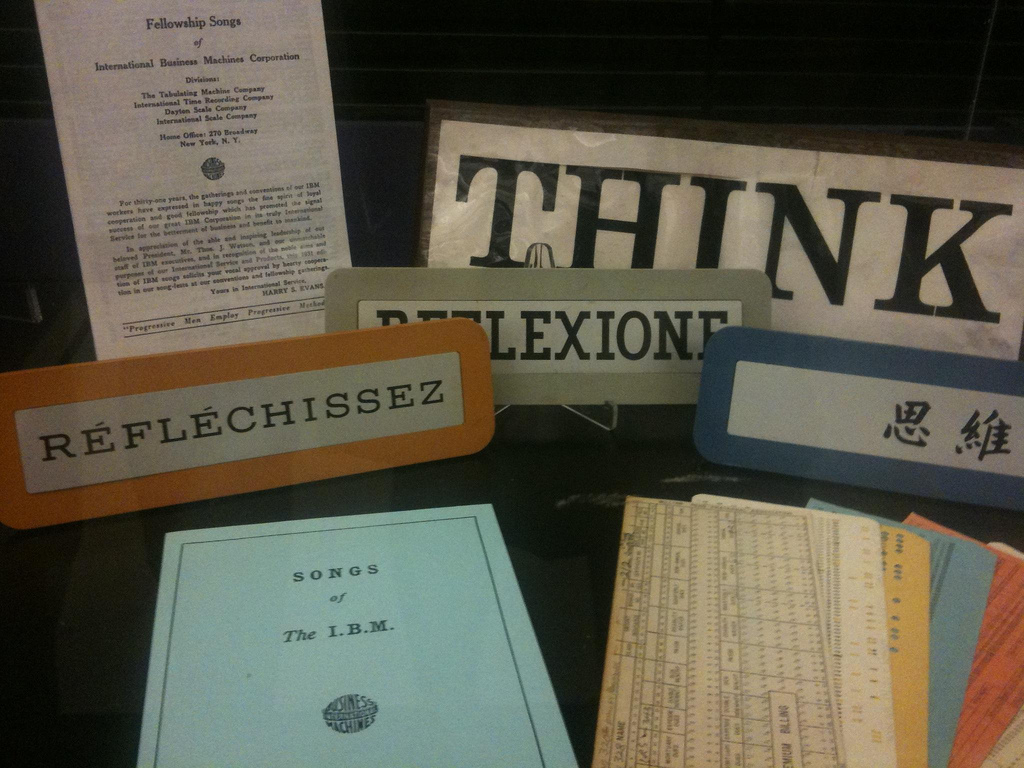
THINK signs in several languages

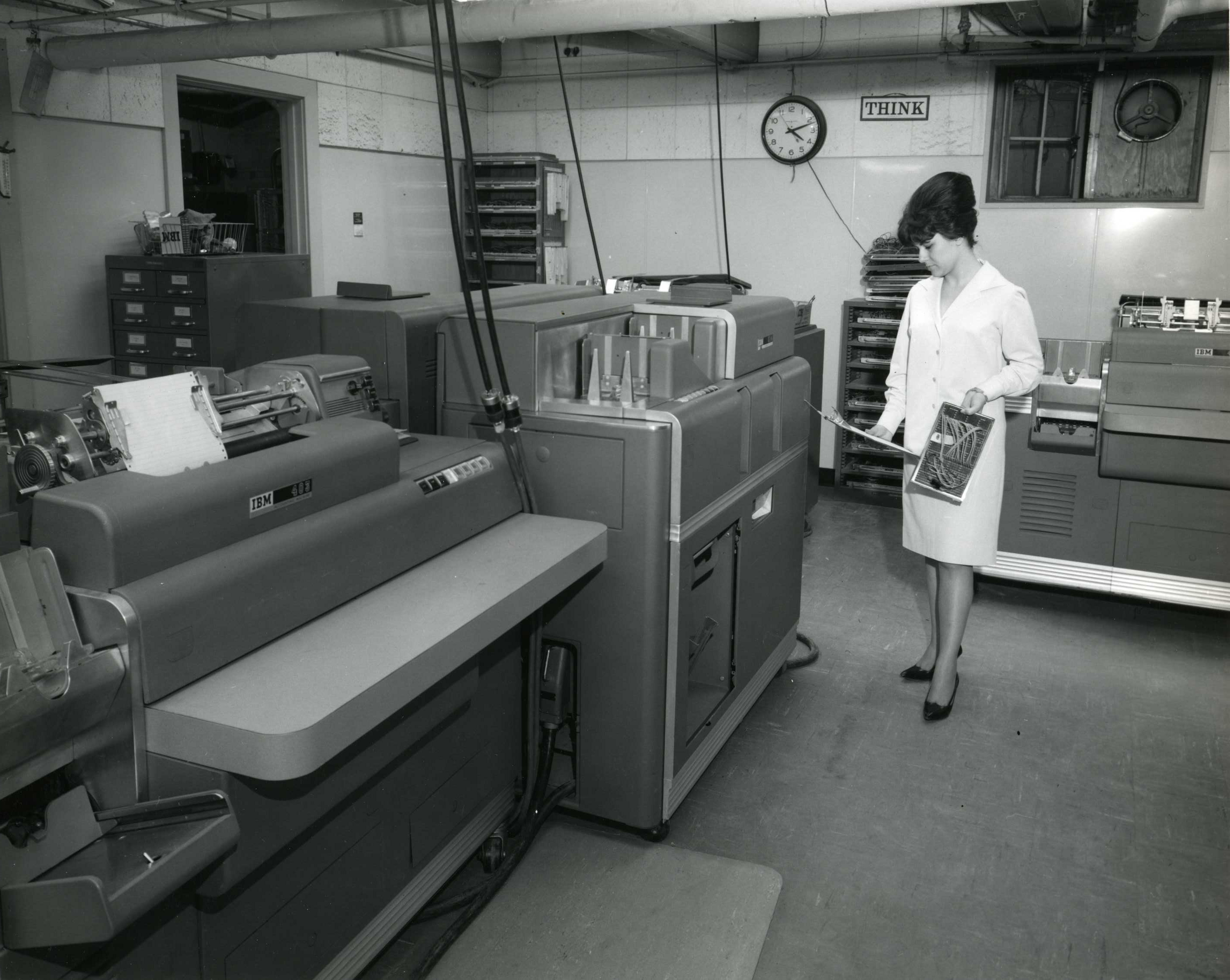
IBM THINK sign at a punched card data processing facility using IBM equipment, c. 1960

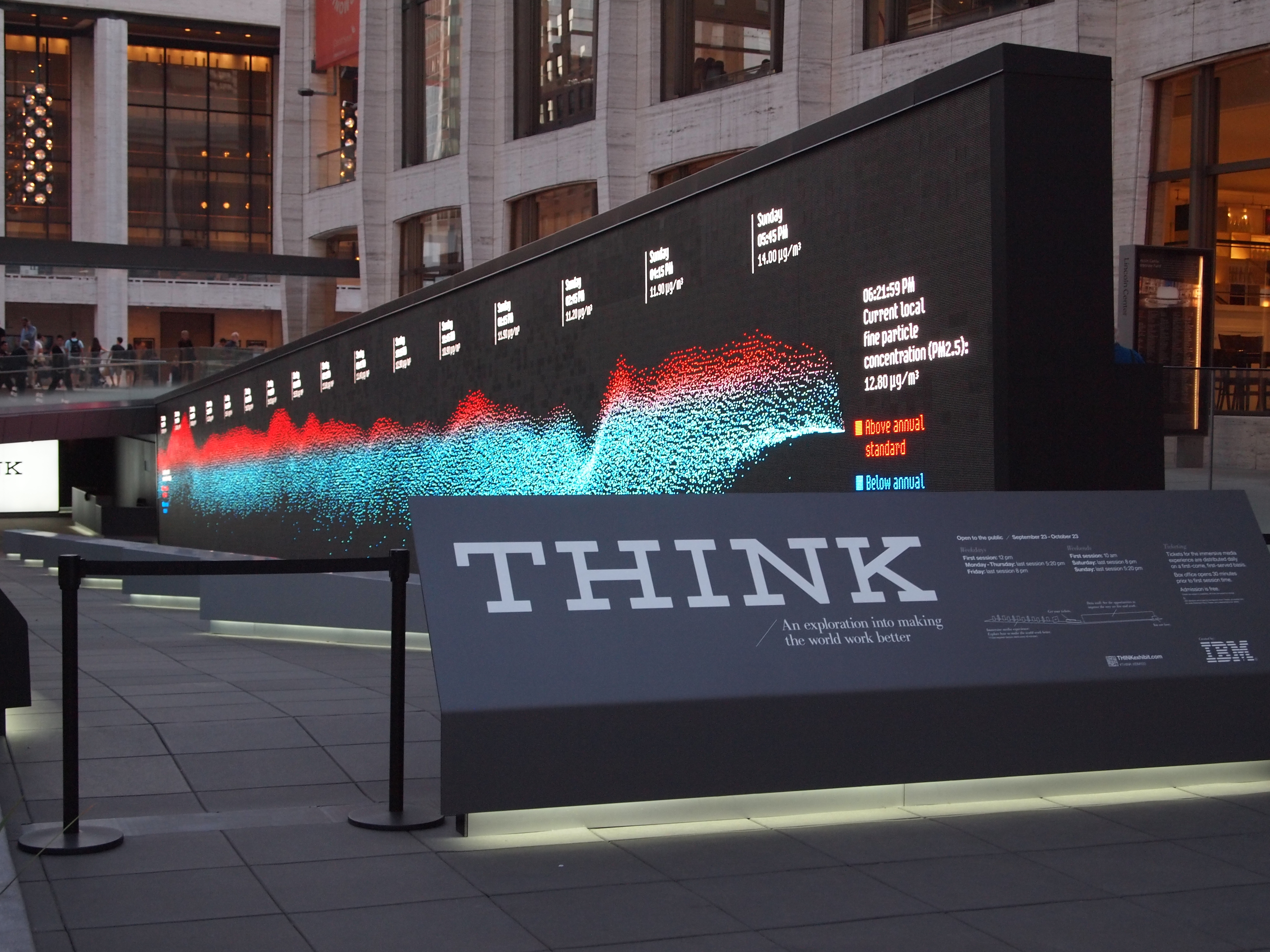
IBM Think-themed exhibit at Lincoln Center in 2011

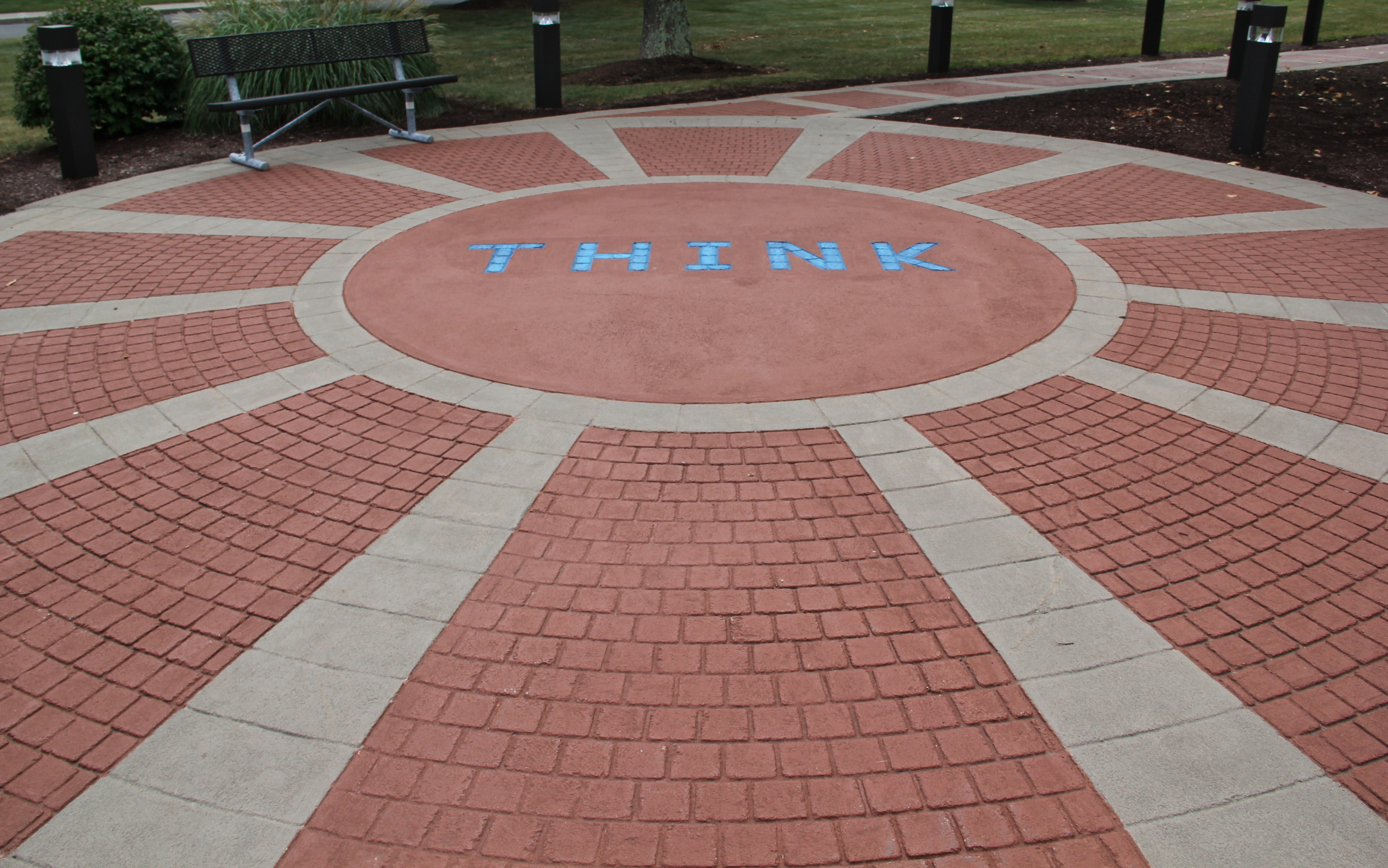
A walking path at the IBM Poughkeepsie site, with the word "THINK"

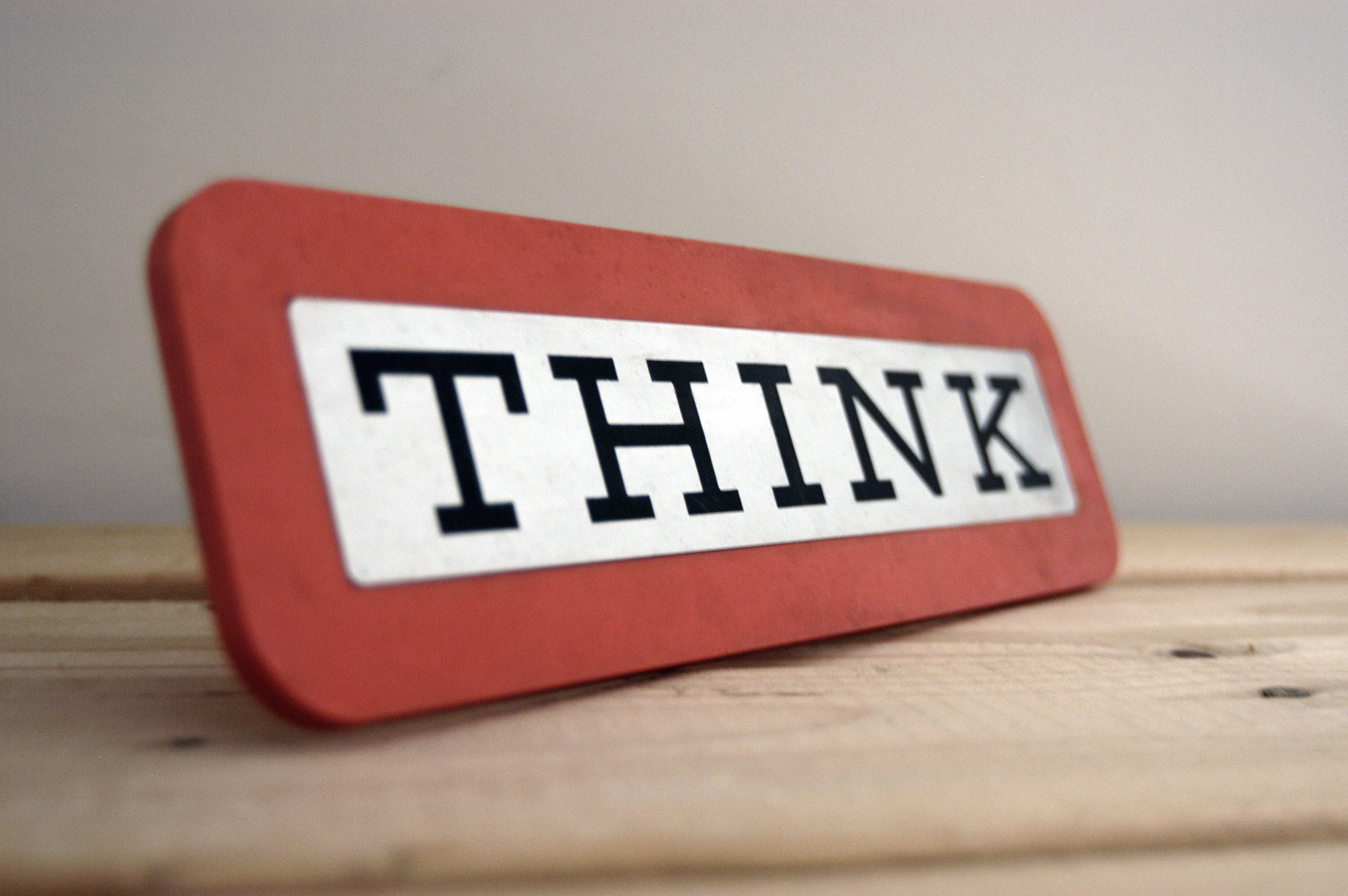
IBM Think sign

== See also ==
- History of IBM
