= IBM Watsonx =

AI platform developed by IBM

watsonx
- Developer: IBM
- Release: May 9, 2023; 3 years ago
- Written in: Python
- Engine: Multiple large language models (LLMs)
- Platform: Cloud computing platforms
- Type: Chatbot; AI fine-tuning of large language models; Generative pre-trained transformer (GPT)
- License: Proprietary
- Website: www.ibm.com/watsonx

Watsonx is a platform by IBM for building and managing artificial intelligence (AI) applications for business use. Released on May 9, 2023, the platform provides software tools and infrastructure for companies to work with both IBM's own AI models and models from third-party sources.

The platform consists of three main components: watsonx.ai, a studio for training, validating, and deploying AI models; watsonx.data, a system for storing and managing data used by the models; and watsonx.governance, a toolkit to ensure AI applications are compliant with company policies and regulations.

A key feature of the platform is that it can be trained on a company's private data to perform specialized tasks, a process known as fine-tuning. IBM states that this client-specific data is not used to train its own models.

== History ==
Watsonx was introduced on May 9, 2023, at the annual IBM Think conference, as a platform that includes multiple services. Just like Watson AI computer with the similar name, Watsonx was named after Thomas J. Watson, IBM's founder and first CEO.

On February 13, 2024, Anaconda partnered with IBM to embed its open-source Python packages into Watsonx.

Watsonx is used at ESPN's Fantasy Football App for managing players' performance, and by Italian telecommunications company Wind Tre. It was employed to generate editorial content around nominees during the 66th Annual Grammy Awards.

In 2025, the Wimbledon Championships integrated IBM watsonx generative AI into its app and website.

Integrated with IBM Safer Payments, IBM watsonx has been used in banking sector fraud detection and anti-money laundering (AML) systems.

== Services ==
=== watsonx.ai ===
Watsonx.ai is a platform that allows AI developers to leverage a wide range of LLMs under IBM's own Granite series and others such as Facebook's LLaMA-2, free and open-source model Mistral, and many others present in the Hugging Face community. These models come pre-trained and optimized for various natural language processing (NLP) applications.The platform also allows fine-tuning with its Tuning Studio.

=== watsonx.data ===
Watsonx.data is a platform designed to assist clients in addressing issues related to data volume, complexity, cost, and governance.. The platform facilitates seamless data access, whether stored in the cloud or on-premises, through a single entry point.

=== watsonx.governance ===
Watsonx.governance is a platform that utilizes IBM's AI capabilities to implement AI lifecycle governance. This helps them manage risks and maintain compliance with evolving AI and industry regulations, while reducing AI bias through automated oversight.

== See also ==
- Watsonx.ai Studio
- Generative AI
- Large language model
- ChatGPT
