= IBM Think conference =

Conference held annually by IBM

IBM Think
- Status: Active
- Genre: IT business
- Frequency: Annual
- Venue: Various; Online
- Inaugurated: 19 March 2018; 8 years ago
- Most recent: 20 May 2024; 2 years ago
- Next event: 5–8 May 2025
- Organizer: IBM
- Website: www.ibm.com/events/think

IBM Think is an annual business conference organized by IBM. Before 2018, IBM held similar business conferences under different names. Think is seen as a successor to World of Watson that was held in 2017. The conference name is a reference to the 'Think' slogan used by IBM.

== History ==
=== 2010s ===
==== 2017 – World of Watson ====
IBM held a conference named World of Watson, centered around its AI products and Watson, a QA computer AI system in Las Vegas, on October 29 – November 2. IBM delivered several speeches related to Watson's capabilities and its possible integration to health and business sectors, which were criticized 2 years later by IEEE Spectrum to be exaggerated.

==== 2018 ====
IBM rebranded its World of Watson convention as IBM Think to be the company's flagship business conference that includes all major IBM products along with Watson. It was held in Las Vegas, on March 19–22. The topics of the conference were mainly about blockchain, AI, data science, quantum computing and cloud. IBM announced the creation of an AI assistant tool called Watson Assistant, and that they AI-enhanced some of their products such as IBM Cloud with the help of Watson, which was criticized by outsiders to not be practical despite years of development. A partnership between IBM and Apple to enhance apps with Watson's AI was revealed as well. IBM unveiled a 1x1mm chip reportedly compatible with Blockchain and as powerful as microprocessors of 1990s that they dubbed "world's smallest computer". IBM also revealed IBM Q, a family of quantum computers that can be accessed via cloud. Think Campuses, a trade exposition area were also introduced for the first time.

==== 2019 ====
The conference was held in Moscone Center, San Francisco, CA, on February 12–15. Topics included cloud, AI, data, analytics, infrastructure and more, a lot similar to previous year. IBM announced Watson Anywhere, allowing Watson AI tools to be used outside of IBM's own cloud services. Harish Natarajan, a grand finalist in 2016's World Debating Championships, had a debate challenge with IBM's Project Debater and won against it while the debate showed state of AI's advancement. Several big customers of IBM had speeches in the conference as well, talking about the impact of IBM's AI/ML products and Power Systems had on their businesses. This year also included a 4-day training program titled Think Academy that provided certification and hand-on lab experience to participants.

=== 2020s ===
==== 2020 ====
The conference was planned to be held in San Francisco again, on May 4–7. Due to COVID-19 pandemic, the conference was made online along with several locally hosted events and interactive sessions. IBM also put a ban on employees to not attend face-to-face conferences with more than 1000 people. This time topics were heavily centered around AI, data, cloud, 5G and various open technologies that were developed under IBM and its subsidiaries. IBM announced several changes to Red Hat, an open-source software and Linux company that IBM bought for 34 billion dollars a year ago, Changes include shifting company's focus to hybrid cloud and 5G compatibility. IBM revealed Watson AIOps, an AI tool to manage IBM built on Red Hat's OpenShift cloud computing software. Along with other topics, IBM Research unveiled its ambitious roadmap for quantum computing.

==== 2021 ====
Two online conferences were held for different regions, on May 11 for Americas and May 12 for APAC, Japan and EMEA. Topics of this year, albeit similar to the previous ones, were centered around hybrid cloud and AI. During the conference, IBM has announced several new projects such as IBM WebSphere Hybrid Edition, a commercialized version of IBM Mono2Micro and Watson Orchestrate, an AI assistant tool that is later renamed Watsonx Orchestrate and became a subfeature of Watsonx in 2023. IBM reported 120x increase in quantum processing speed of Qiskit, an open source quantum computing SDK maintained by the company, and revealed Qiskit runtime to enable traditional computer processing when its desired within the SDK. IBM announced a 1 billion dollars' worth of investment to its partnership programs as well.

==== 2022 ====
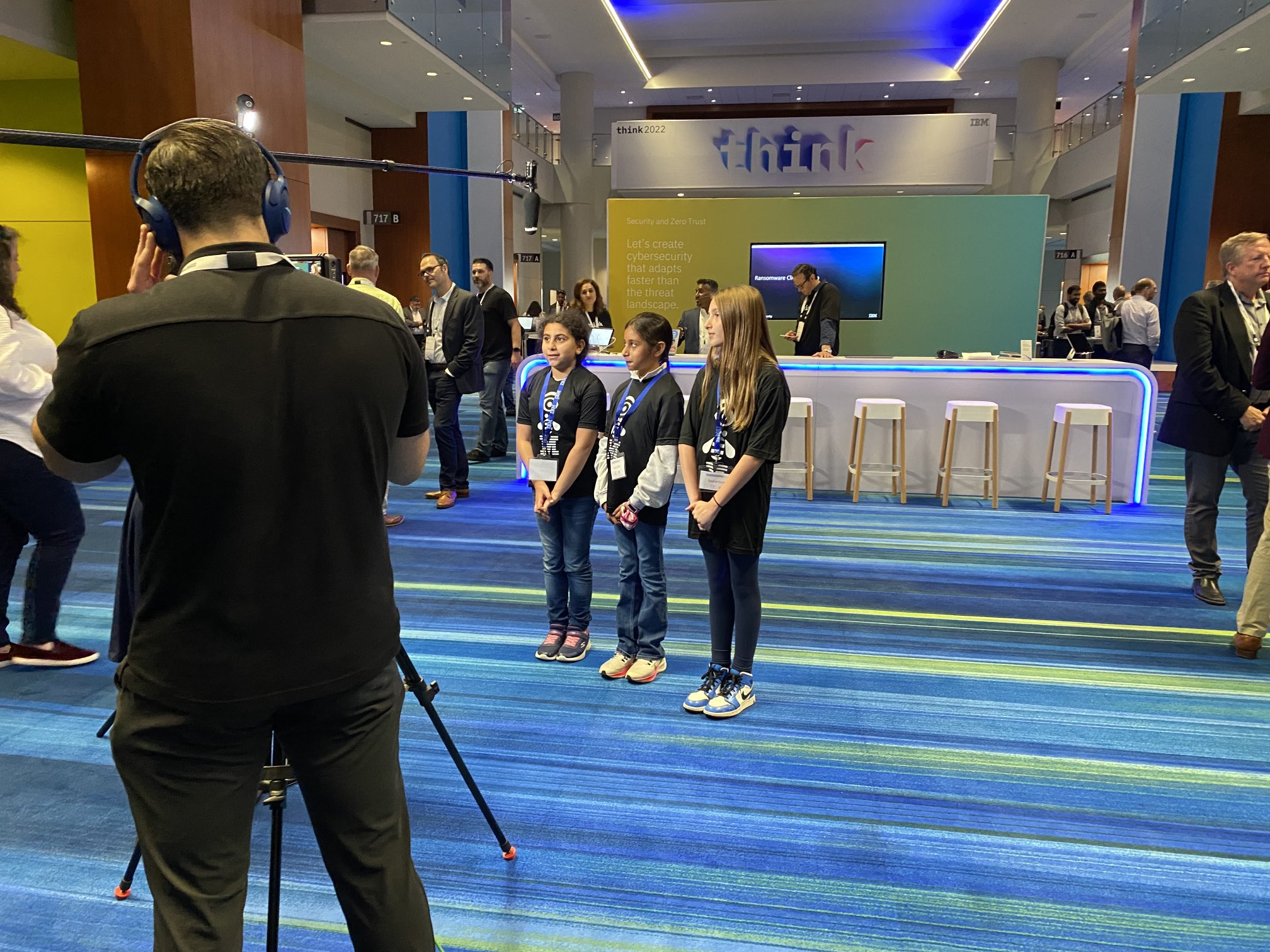
3 young girls are taking a picture at an IBM Think 2022 event organized in Toronto.

The conference was held digital and face-to-face in Boston, on May 10–11. Several other conferences in attendance were held in various cities around the world. This time the conference was centered around quantum computing, a field IBM started to be prevalent about along with other usual topics like AI and cloud. In the conference IBM announced its goal to achieve a 4,000+ qubit processor built with multiple clusters of modularly scaled processors. IBM also announced updates regarding Qiskit and company's growth in AI sector. IBM also announced multiple partnerships with other companies including providing SaaS and Red Hat software to AWS, a rival cloud service provider.

==== 2023 ====
The conference was held in Orlando, FL, on May 9–11. The conference was expanded to other regions via one day local events titled Think on Tour. For the main conference, Think Forum was revealed as a platform for atendees to talk with tech business leaders, which shifted Think's definition as an expo to that of a forum. The program of the conference included similar topics to previous years such as hybrid cloud, AI and automation and futuristic quantum computing talks. IBM unveiled many new projects and products such as Watsonx, a generative AI tool and IBM Quantum System Two, a quantum computer.

==== 2024 ====
The conference took place from May 20–23 at the Boston Convention and Exhibition Center. May 20th was the IBM Partner Plus Day dedicated to IBM's partner community, featuring an opening keynote, networking sessions, and geography panels. The subsequent days offered a variety of keynotes, sessions, and demonstrations. Key topics included scaling businesses with AI and hybrid cloud, the transformative power of AI and automation, and building architectures to support scaled AI. Attendees had access to a special Blue Block Party at Harpoon Brewery.

==== 2025 ====
The conference is scheduled for May 5–8 in Boston at the Hynes Convention Center. The themes are planned to be AI Productivity, AI Trusted Data, Scalable AI Architectures, and Cost Optimization. Examples of implementation will be shown from Ferrari, UFC, the US Open, and The Masters. In addition to the main event in Boston, the conference will extend its reach through the "Think on Tour" series, visiting 12 cities worldwide.
