= ThinkVision =

Computer monitor

ThinkVision displays
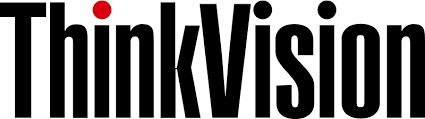

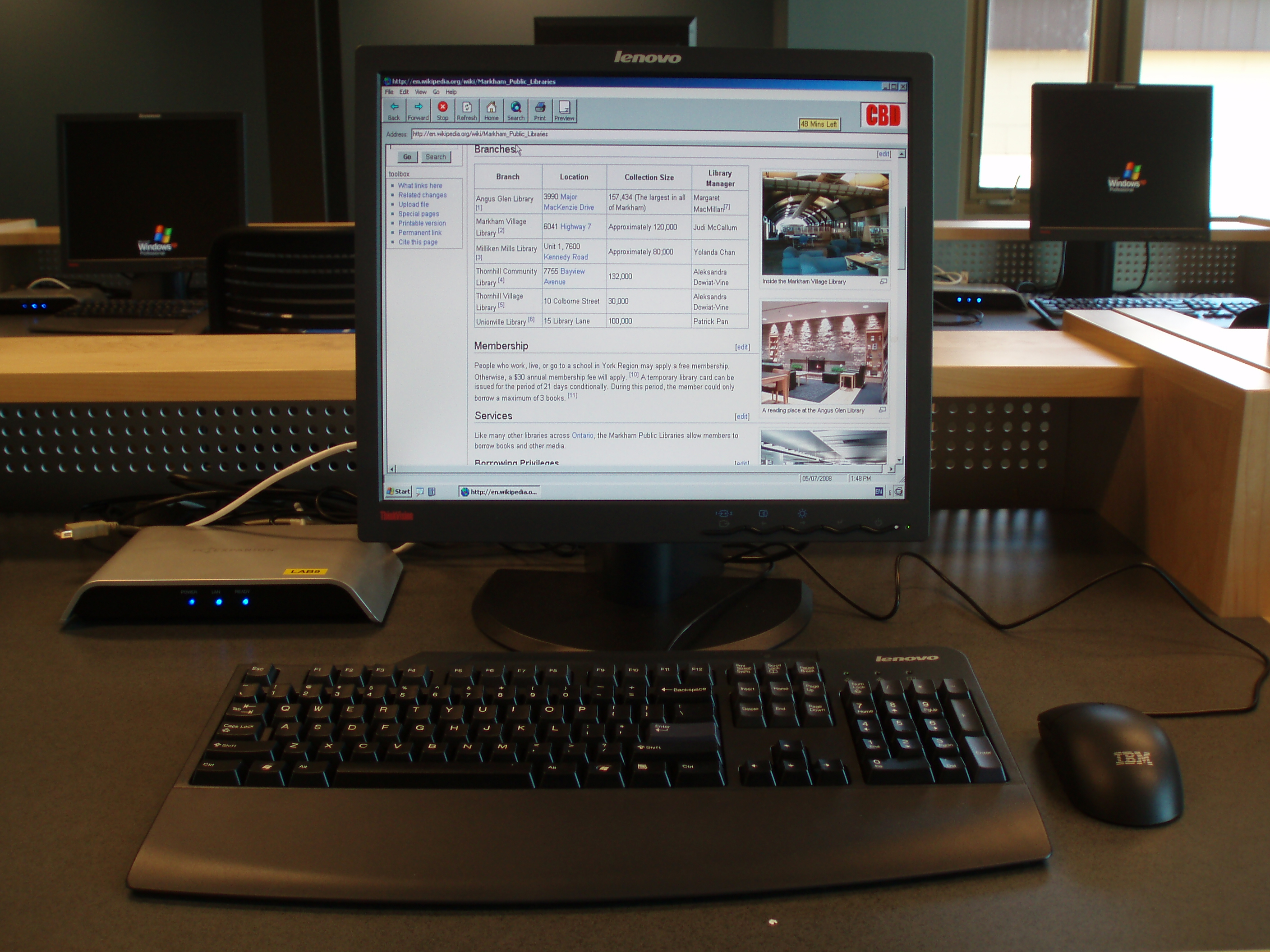
- Developer: Lenovo/IBM
- Type: Computer monitor
- Website: www.lenovo.com/.../business/monitors

ThinkVision displays are high-end computer monitors manufactured, designed and developed by IBM and Lenovo.

ThinkVision products are built using the design language of other Think devices such as the ThinkPad line of notebook computers and the ThinkCentre or ThinkStation lines of desktops.

== Computer monitors ==
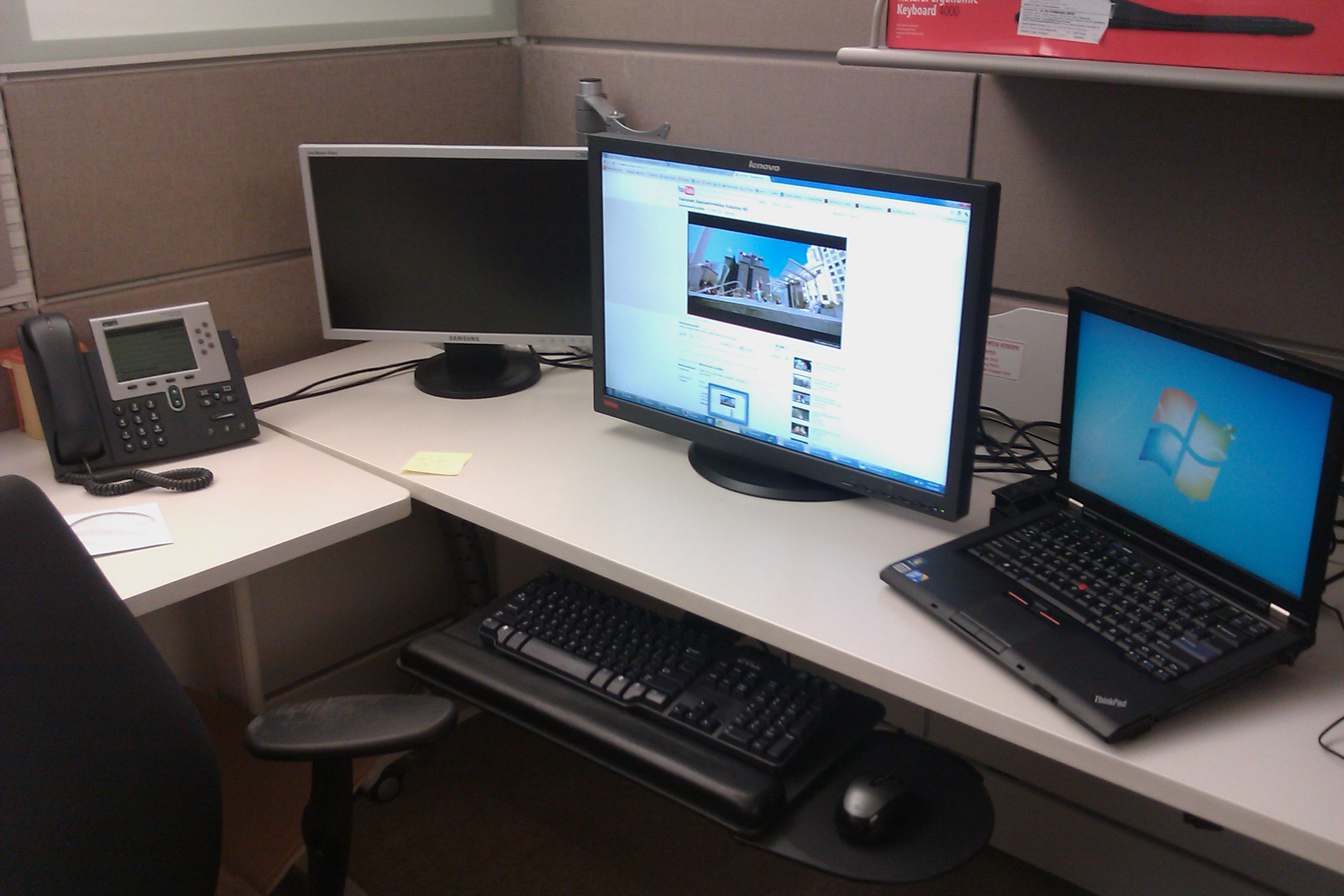
ThinkVision display and ThinkPad T series laptop

=== E series ===
Affordable, comfortable, wide-angle monitors that deliver sharp visuals in the office or at home.

=== S series ===
Mainstream monitors with balanced performance and style. Typical specifications include a Full HD VA/WVA display with a resolution of 1920 × 1080 combined with a 178° vision angle and to TÜV Low Blue Light certification and a flicker-free display typical for this line in early 2021. They typically feature a tilting stand and a VESA mount.

=== L series ===
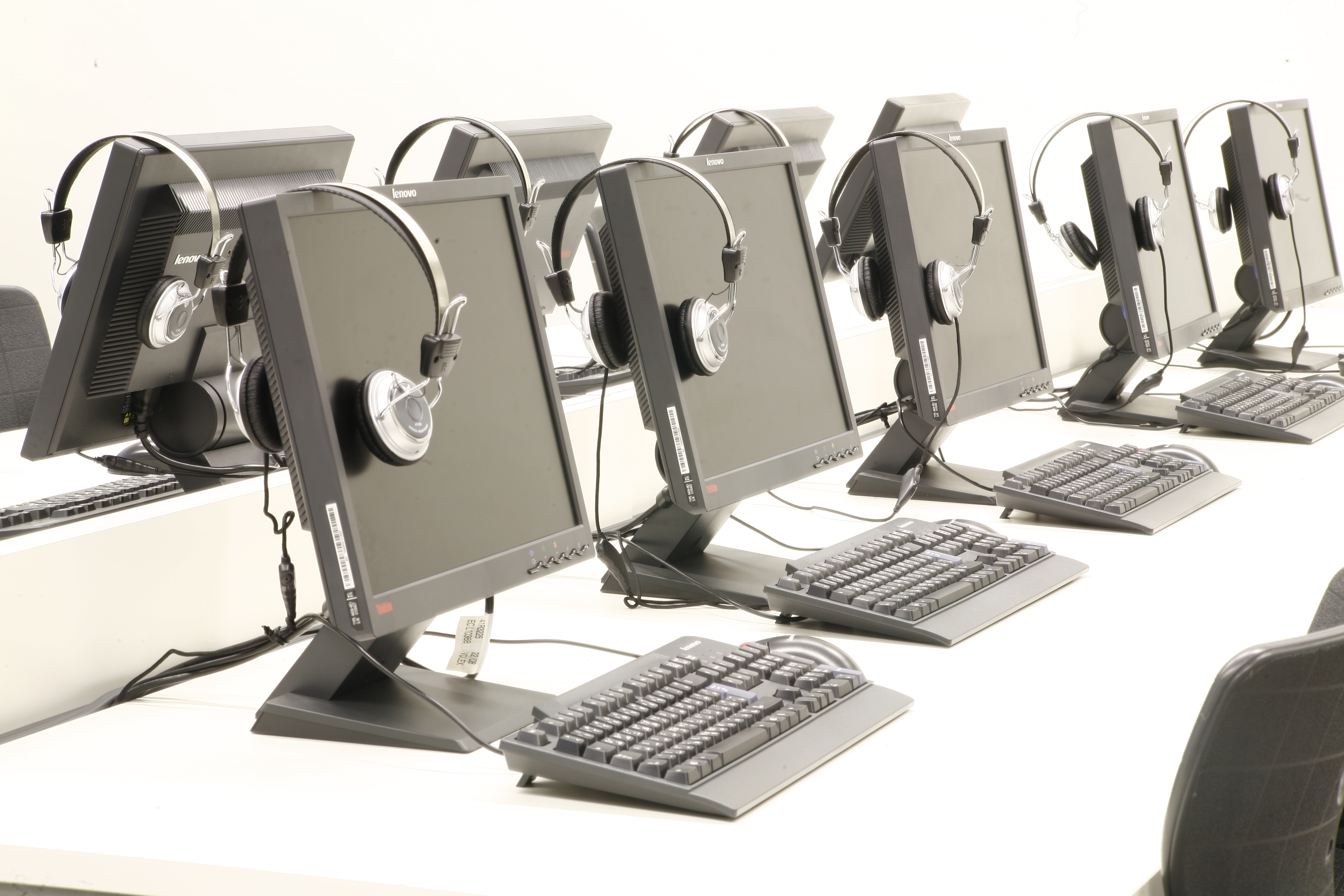
ThinkVision L197 displays in a college

Similar to The S Series, but have smaller display sizes in their range.

==== LT series ====
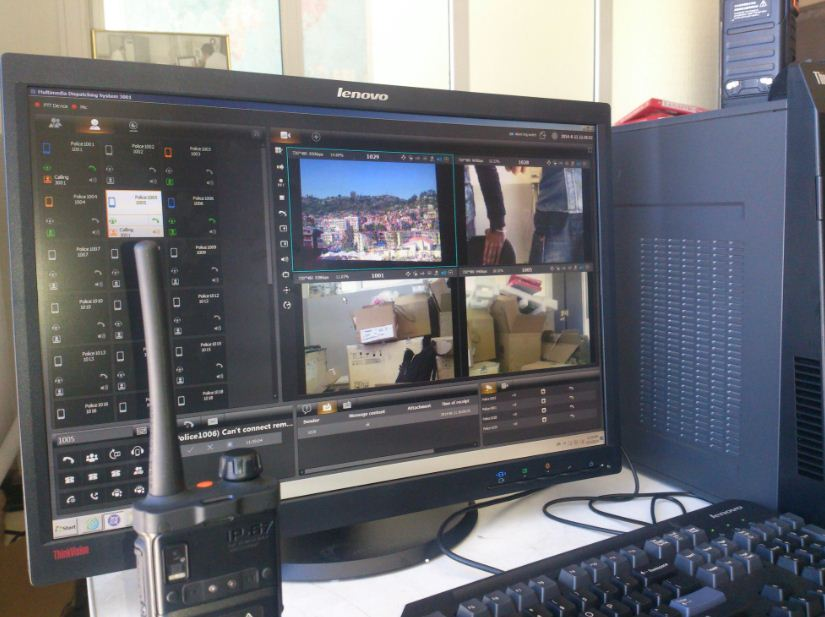
ThinkVision LT series display

The series is intended primarily for business use and emphasizes energy efficiency. Depending on the model, available connections may include VGA, DVI-D, and DisplayPort. Some LT-series models provide swivel, tilt, and height adjustments, with specified response times of 5 milliseconds and contrast ratios of 1,000:1.

=== T series ===
High-performance ergonomic monitors optimized for business and corporate use, including VoIP and USB hub models. This line comes with a WVA borderless display. They feature VGA, DP and HDMI ports.

=== P series ===
Professional performance monitor line, typically boasting the highest resolutions and latest features.

=== X series ===
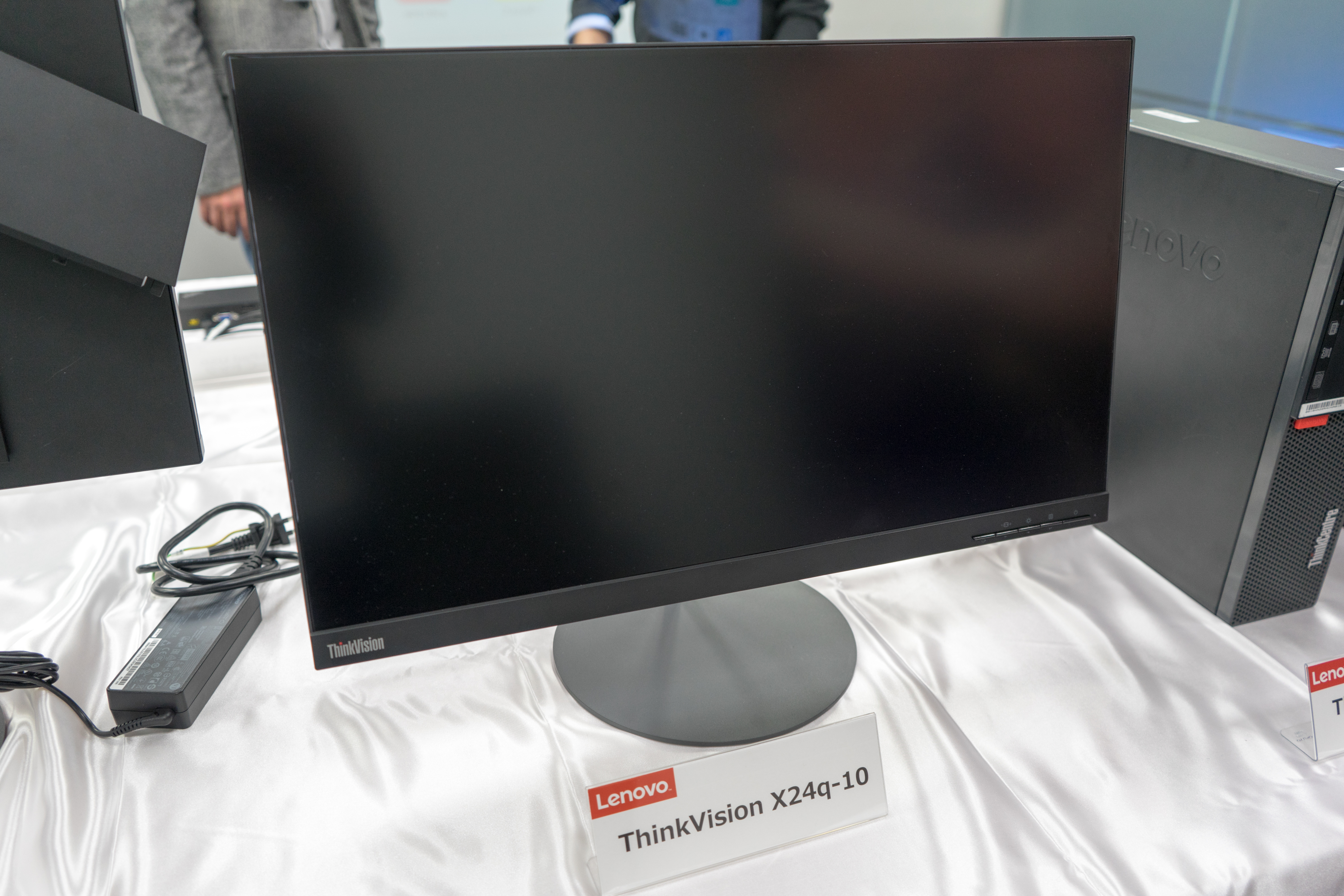
ThinkVision X24q

This line features a more refined design and mainstream high-end functionality. It features high resolution devices with advanced connection options.

=== Pro series ===
In January 2014, Lenovo launched the ThinkVision Pro 2840m. It was marketed as the "Ultimate Professional 4K Display". Some additions were made to the product: a 28-inch display with 4K resolution (ultra-high definition monitor) supporting an Android platform. It is marketed for home office and entertainment use.

== Portable monitors ==
=== LT series ===
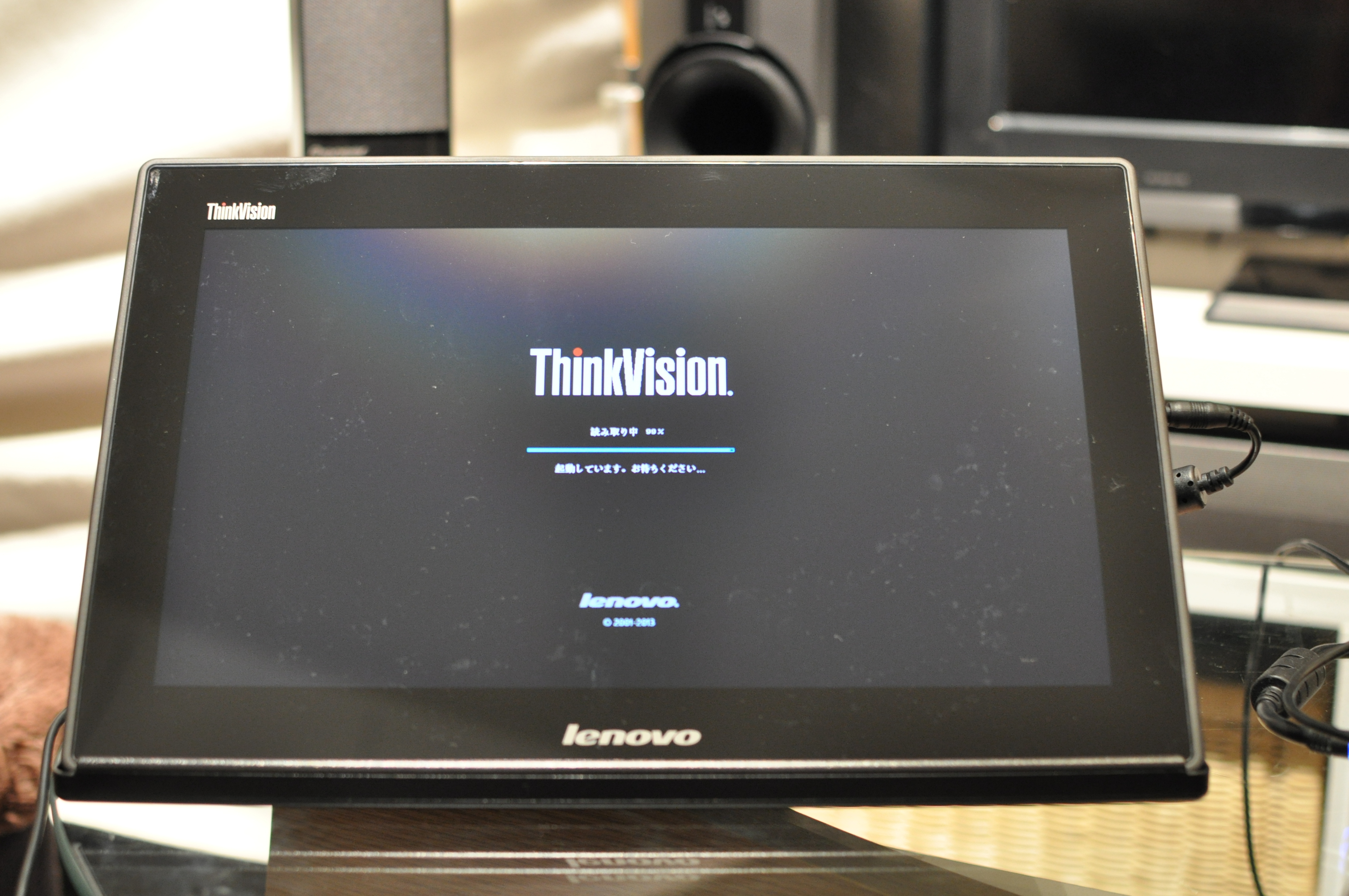
ThinkVision LT1423p

==== LT1423p ====
In January 2013 Lenovo announced the ThinkVision LT1423p, a mobile touchscreen display designed for use with Microsoft's Windows 8 operating system. The LT1423p is a 13.3-inch AH-IPS display with 1600x900 resolution. The face of the device is Gorilla Glass in order to make it more durable. Pen-based and multitouch finger-based input are both supported. Wired and wireless versions are available. The wireless version supports WiFi and USB 3.0 connections. The wired version uses USB for both data and power.

=== M series ===
==== M14 ====
The M14 is a portable 14" USB-C monitor with a 1920x1080 resolution. It features two USB-C ports on both sides of the device. It is marketed for portability, connectivity, and flexibility.

== See also ==
- HP DreamColor displays
- EIZO ColorEdge displays
- NEC MultiSync displays
- Iiyama ProLite displays
