= David Ferrucci =

IBM employee

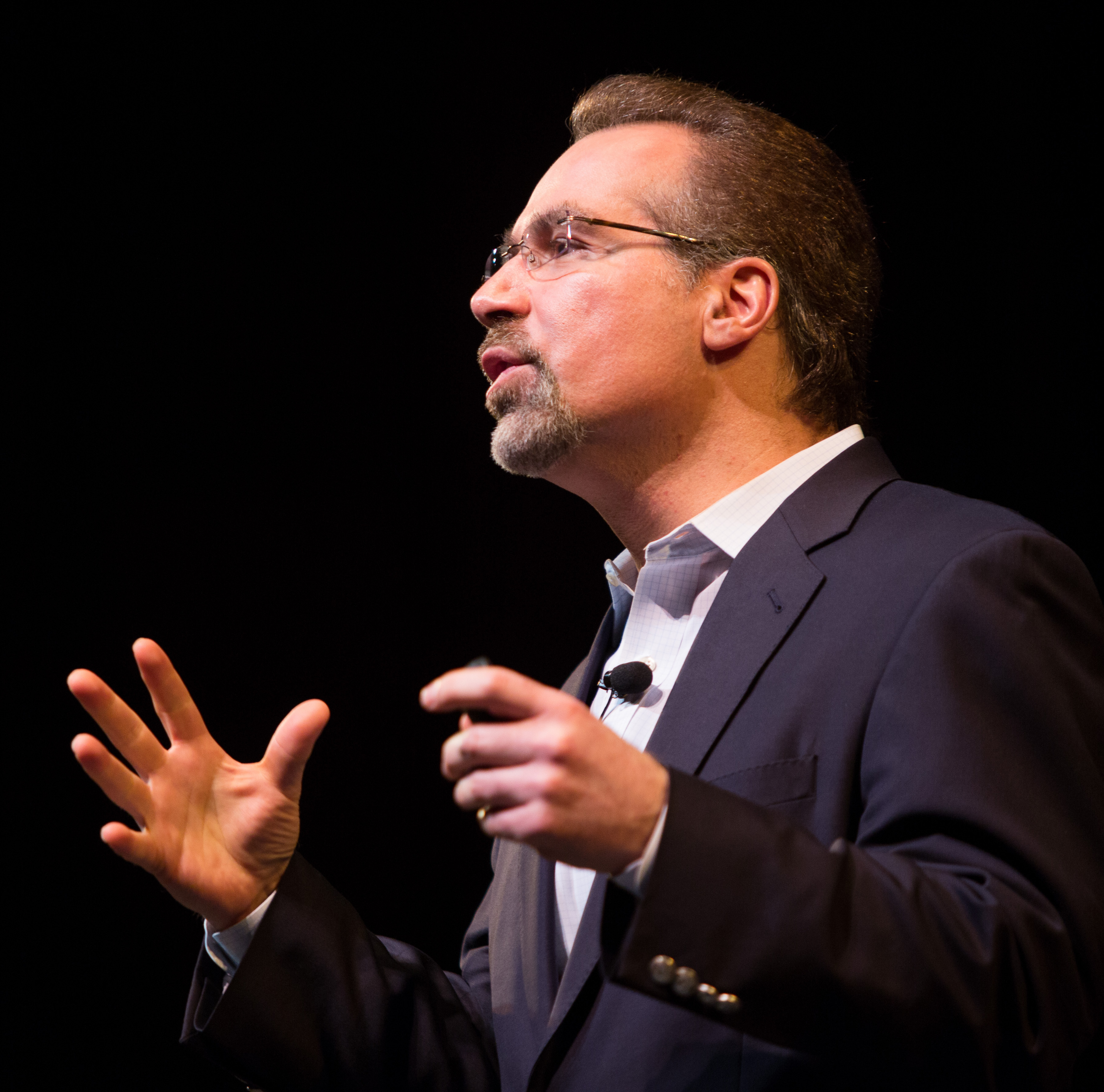
David Ferrucci speaking at TEDx Binghamton University

David A. Ferrucci is an American computer scientist who served as the principal investigator of a team of IBM and academic researchers and engineers between 2007 and 2011 to the development of the Watson computer system, which won the television quiz show Jeopardy!.

Ferrucci graduated from Manhattan College, with a B.S. degree in biology and from Rensselaer Polytechnic Institute, in 1994 with a Ph.D. degree in computer science specializing in knowledge representation and reasoning. He joined IBM's Watson project in 1995 and left in 2012 to join Bridgewater Associates. He is also the founder, CEO, and Chief Scientist of Elemental Cognition, a venture exploring a new field of study called "natural learning", which Ferrucci describes as "artificial intelligence that understands the world the way people do."

In December 2024, he became Managing Director of the Institute for Advanced Enterprise AI, "a new non-profit research organization dedicated to helping business leaders tackle complex challenges with reliable, explainable AI."

Ferrucci is interviewed in the 2018 documentary on artificial intelligence Do You Trust This Computer?

== Books ==
Ferrucci contributed one chapter to the 2018 book Architects of Intelligence: The Truth About AI from the People Building it by the American futurist Martin Ford.
