= Ontology language =

Formal language used to construct ontologies

In computer science and artificial intelligence, ontology languages are formal languages used to construct ontologies. They allow the encoding of knowledge about specific domains and often include reasoning rules that support the processing of that knowledge. Ontology languages are usually declarative languages, are almost always generalizations of frame languages, and are commonly based on either first-order logic or on description logic.

== Classification of ontology languages ==
=== Classification by syntax ===
==== Traditional syntax ontology languages ====
- Common Logic - and its dialects
- CycL
- DOGMA (Developing Ontology-Grounded Methods and Applications)
- F-Logic (Frame Logic)
- FO-dot (First-order logic extended with types, arithmetic, aggregates and inductive definitions)
- KIF (Knowledge Interchange Format)
  - Ontolingua based on KIF
- KL-ONE
- KM programming language
- LOOM (ontology)
- OCML (Operational Conceptual Modelling Language)
- OKBC (Open Knowledge Base Connectivity)
- PLIB (Parts LIBrary)
- RACER

==== Markup ontology languages ====
These languages use a markup scheme to encode knowledge, most commonly with XML.

- DAML+OIL
- Ontology Inference Layer (OIL)
- Web Ontology Language (OWL)
- Resource Description Framework (RDF)
- RDF Schema (RDFS)
- SHOE

==== Controlled natural languages ====
- Attempto Controlled English

==== Open vocabulary natural languages ====
- Executable English

=== Classification by structure (logic type) ===
==== Frame-based ====
Three languages are completely or partially frame-based languages.

- F-Logic
- OKBC
- KM

==== Description logic-based ====
Description logic provides an extension of frame languages, without going so far as to take the leap to first-order logic and support for arbitrary predicates.

- KL-ONE
- RACER
- OWL

Gellish is an example of a combined ontology language and ontology that is description logic-based. It distinguishes between the semantic differences among others of:

- relation types for relations between concepts (classes)
- relation types for relations between individuals
- relation types for relations between individuals and classes

It also contains constructs to express queries and communicative intent.

==== First-order logic-based ====
Several ontology languages support expressions in first-order logic and allow general predicates.

- Common Logic
- CycL
- FO-dot (first-order logic extended with types, arithmetic, aggregates and inductive definitions)
- KIF

== See also ==
- Domain theory
- Formal concept analysis
- Galois connection
- Lattice (order)
- Modeling language
- OntoUML
