= Inconstant =

Inconstant is the name of several merchant and naval ships including:

- The brig Inconstant, built in 1811, in which Napoleon escaped from Elba in 1815
- The brig Inconstant, launched in 1811 in France, that became Swiftsure and that was wrecked c.1831.
- The sailing ship Inconstant, built in 1848, which played an important role in the history of Wellington, New Zealand as "Plimmer's Ark"
- Six ships of the British Royal Navy have been named HMS Inconstant, see HMS Inconstant.

== See also ==
- Inconstancy (disambiguation)
