= Certain answer =

In database theory and knowledge representation, the certain answers is the set of answers to a given query consisting of the intersection of all the complete databases that are consistent with a given knowledge base. The notion of certain answer, investigated in database theory since the 1970s, is indeed defined in the context of open world assumption, where the given knowledge base is assumed to be incomplete.

Intuitively, certain answers are the answers that are always returned when querying a given knowledge base, considering both the extensional knowledge that the possible implications inferred by automatic reasoning, regardless of the specific interpretation.

== Definition ==
In literature, the set of certain answers is usually defined as follows:

$$cert_\cap(Q,D) = \bigcap \left\{ Q(D')| D' \!\in [\![ D ]\!] \right\}$$

where:

- $Q$ is a query
- $D$ is an incomplete database
- $D'$ is any complete database consistent with $D$
- $[\![ D ]\!]$ is the semantics of $D$

In description logics, such set may be defined in a similar way as follows:

Given an ontology $\mathcal{K}=\langle\mathcal{T},\mathcal{A}\rangle$ and a query $q(\vec x)$ on $\mathcal{K}$, $cert(q,\mathcal{K})$ is the set of tuples $\vec a \subseteq \Gamma$ such that, for each model $\mathcal{I}$ of $\mathcal{K}$, we have that $\mathcal{I}\models q[\vec a]$.

Where:

- $\mathcal{T}$ and $\mathcal{A}$ are respectively a Tbox and an Abox;
- $\Gamma$ is the alphabet of constants (individuals or values) of the ontology;
- $q[\vec a]$ is obtained by replacing all the free variables in $q(\vec x)$ with constants of $\vec a$.

== See also ==
- Open world assumption
- Closed world assumption
- Completeness (knowledge bases)
