= Inconstancy =

Inconstancy may refer to:

- Inconsistency
- Impermanence

== See also ==
- Consistency (disambiguation)
- Constancy
- Inconstant
