= Pred =

Pred may refer to:

- Prednisolone, as a tradename, and abbreviation
- Predator, as an abbreviation
  - Nashville Predators, American hockey team; often called the "Preds"
- Macro (computer science), as an abbreviation of "predefined"/"predefinition"
- Allan Pred (1936-2007) U.S. geographer
- Michele Pred, Swedish-American feminist artist

== See also ==
- Predator (disambiguation), abbreviation of several entries
- Predicate (disambiguation), abbreviation of several entries
