= Larry Heck =

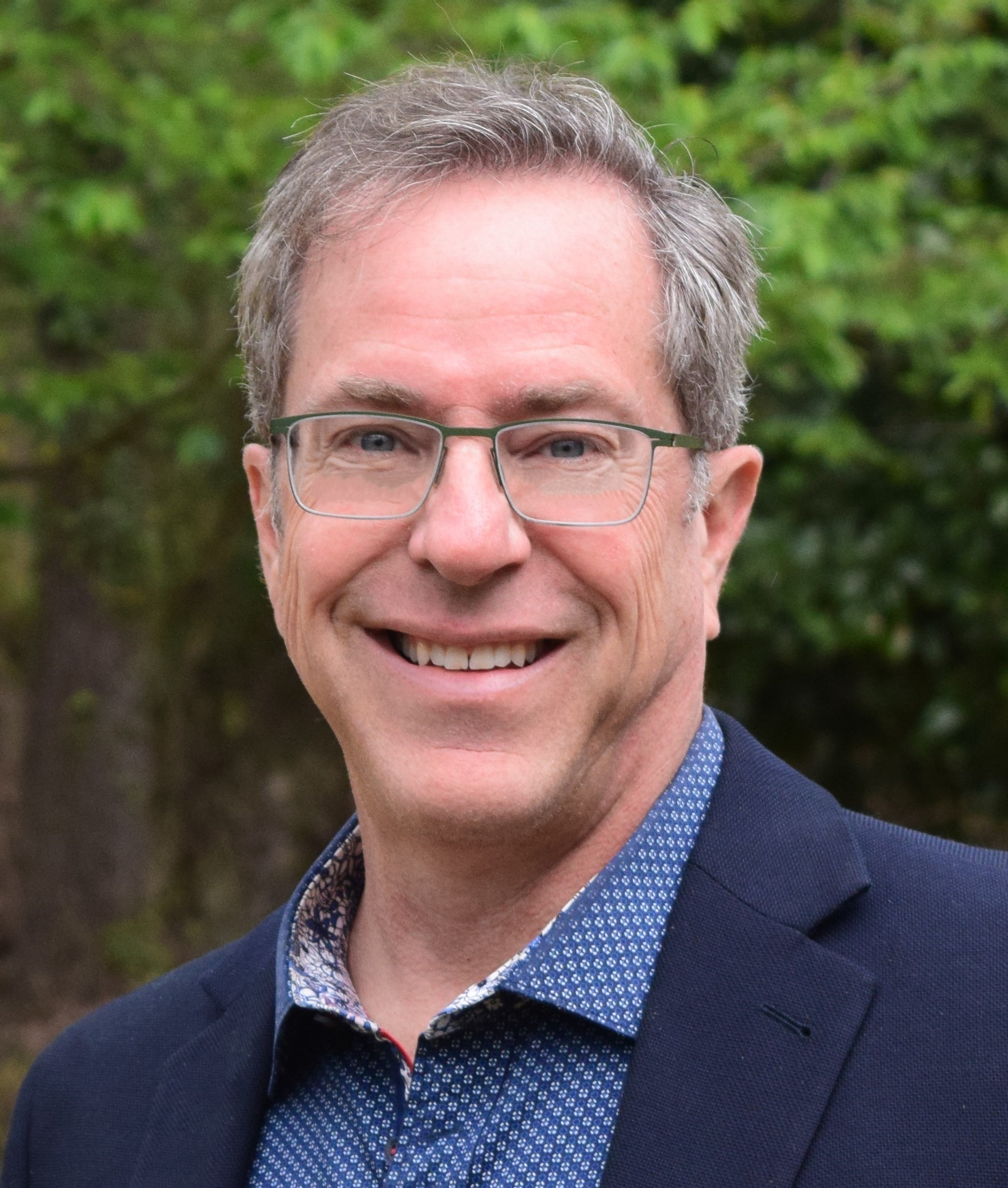
- Born: Larry Paul Heck; Havre, Montana, U.S.
- Education: Georgia Institute of Technology, Texas Tech University
- Scientific career
- Workplaces: Viv; Samsung; Google; Microsoft; Yahoo! Nuance Communications; Stanford Research Institute
- Thesis: A Subspace Approach to the Automatic Design of Pattern Recognition Systems for Mechanical System Monitoring (1991)
- Doctoral advisor: Prof. James H. McClellan

Larry Paul Heck is the Rhesa Screven Farmer, Jr., Advanced Computing Concepts Chair, Georgia Research Alliance Eminent Scholar, Co-Executive Director of the Machine Learning Center and Professor at the Georgia Institute of Technology. His career spans many of the sub-disciplines of artificial intelligence, including conversational AI, speech recognition and speaker recognition, natural language processing, web search, online advertising and acoustics. He is best known for his role as a co-founder of the Microsoft Cortana Personal Assistant and his early work in deep learning for speech processing.

== Education and career ==
Larry Heck was born in Havre, Montana. After receiving the Bachelor of Science in electrical engineering at Texas Tech University, he was admitted to graduate school at the Georgia Institute of Technology in 1986. Heck received the MSEE in 1989 and the PhD in 1991 under advisor Prof. James H. McClellan.

From 1992 to 1998, he was a senior research engineer at SRI International with the Acoustics and Radar Technology Lab (ARTL) and Speech Technology and Research (STAR) Lab, and in 1998 joined Nuance Communications, serving as vice president of R&D.

Funded by the US government's NSA and DARPA from 1995-1998, Heck led the SRI team that was the first to successfully create large-scale deep neural network (DNN) deep learning technology in the field of speech processing. The deep learning technology was used to win the 1998 National Institute of Standards and Technology Speaker Recognition evaluation. The approach trained a 5-layer deep neural network, with the first two layers used as a (learned) feature extractor. To stabilize the training of the DNN, a weight normalization method was used (later rediscovered in 2010 by Xavier, et.al). Heck deployed this DNN in 1999 with Nuance Communications at the Home Shopping Network, representing the first major industrial application of deep learning with over 100K Nuance Verifier voiceprints.

From 2005 to 2008, he was vice president of search & advertising quality at Yahoo!. In 2008, Heck and Ron Brachman combined search & advertising quality with Yahoo! Research to form Yahoo! Labs.

Beginning in 2009, he was the chief scientist of speech products at Microsoft. In this role, he established the vision, mission and long-range plan and hired the initial team to create Microsoft’s digital-personal-assistant Cortana. Heck was named a Microsoft Distinguished Engineer in 2012 and joined Microsoft Research that same year.

In 2014, he joined Google as a principal research scientist, where he founded the deep learning-based conversational AI team "Deep Dialogue". The team works on advanced research for the Google Assistant.

In 2017, Heck joined Samsung as SVP and co-head of global AI Research. In 2019, he became head of Bixby (virtual assistant) North America and the CEO of Viv Labs, an independent subsidiary of Samsung. In that same year, Heck led one of the first large scale deployments of Transformer-Based LLMs as part of the Bixby Categories launch at the 2019 Samsung Developer Conference.

In 2021, Heck returned to the Georgia Institute of Technology as a Professor.

== Awards and honors ==
Larry Heck was named Fellow of the Institute of Electrical and Electronics Engineers (IEEE) in 2016 for leadership in application of machine learning to spoken and text language processing.

Heck was inducted as a Fellow of the National Academy of Inventors (NAI) in 2024.

Heck received the 2017 Academy of Distinguished Engineering Alumni Award from the Georgia Institute of Technology. In the same year, he also received the Texas Tech University Whitacre College of Engineering Distinguished Engineer Award.

Larry Heck has several best papers including the 2020 IEEE Signal Processing Society (SPS) Best Paper Award: “Using Recurrent Neural Networks for Slot Filling in Spoken Language Understanding” published in the IEEE/ACM Transactions on Audio, Speech, and Language Processing in March 2015, and the 2020 ACM Conference on Information and Knowledge Management (CIKM) Test of Time Award for the paper "Learning Deep Structured Semantic Models for Web Search using Clickthrough Data".
