= Consistency (disambiguation) =

Consistency, in logic, is a quality of no contradiction.

Consistency may also refer to:

== Computer science ==
- Consistency (database systems)
- Consistency (knowledge bases)
- Consistency (user interfaces)
- Consistent hashing
- Consistent heuristic
- Consistency model
- Data consistency

== Statistics ==
- Consistency (statistics), a property of an estimation technique giving the right answer with an infinite amount of data
  - Consistent estimator
  - Fisher consistency
  - Consistent test: see Statistical hypothesis testing

== Physics ==
- The viscosity of a thick fluid
- Consistent histories, in quantum mechanics
- the percent dry fiber in a pulp slurry, when producing paper

== Other uses ==
- Consistency (negotiation), the psychological need to be consistent with prior acts and statements
- "Consistency", an 1887 speech by Mark Twain
- "Consistency", a song by Megan Thee Stallion and Jhené Aiko from the album Traumazine, 2022
- The consistency criterion, a measure of a voting system requiring that where one is elected by all segments of the voters, one must win the election
- Consistency Theory, an album by 1200 Techniques
- Consistent and inconsistent equations, in mathematics
- Consistent life ethic, an ideology stating that life is sacred
- Equiconsistency, in logic
- Mr. Consistency (foaled 1958), American Thoroughbred racehorse

== See also ==
- Constancy (disambiguation)
- Wikipedia:Consistency (disambiguation)
