= Constancy =

Constancy may refer to:

- Subjective constancy
- Color constancy
- Consistency (see also Consistency (disambiguation))
- Permanence
- Immutability, as a theological attribute

== See also ==
- Constant (disambiguation)
- Inconstancy (disambiguation)
