= DATR =

DATR is a language for lexical knowledge representation. The lexical knowledge is encoded in a network of nodes. Each node has a set of attributes encoded with it. A node can represent a word or a word form.

DATR was developed in the late 1980s by Roger Evans, Gerald Gazdar and Bill Keller, and used extensively in the 1990s; the standard specification is contained in the Evans and Gazdar RFC, available on the Sussex website (below). DATR has been implemented in a variety of programming languages, and several implementations are available on the internet, including an RFC compliant implementation at the Bielefeld website (below).

DATR is still used for encoding inheritance networks in various linguistic and non-linguistic domains and is under discussion as a standard notation for the representation of lexical information.
