= Swiftsure (1811 brig) =

History

France
- Name: Inconstant
- Launched: 1811

United Kingdom
- Name: Swiftsure
- Acquired: 1813 by purchase of a prize
- Fate: Wrecked 4 July 1829

General characteristics
- Tons burthen: 326, or 337 tons (bm)
- Draught: 14 ft (4.3 m)
- Propulsion: Sails
- Sail plan: Ship-rigged
- Armament: 4 × 9-pounder guns + 10 × 32-pounder carronades

Swiftsure was built in 1811 in France as Inconstant. In 1813 British owners purchased her and renamed her. An American privateer captured her in 1814 but she was quickly recaptured. Swiftsure was wrecked off the coast of Queensland in 1831.

Note: This is not the Inconstant that carried Napoleon from exile on Elba to the Hundred Days. That was another brig Inconstant, of roughly the same size as Swiftsure, and also launched in 1811. However, the vessel that transported Napoleon belonged to the French Navy, and was broken up at Brest in 1843.

== History ==
Swiftsure was built in 1811 for a French owner as the single-decked brig-rigged Inconstant.

Swiftsure first entered Lloyd's Register in 1813 with J.Banner, master, Crawford, owner, and trade Greenock–Newfoundland.

On 4 August 1814, Swiftsure, Lester, master, arrived at Newfoundland from Glasgow. Lloyd's List (LL) reported on 21 October 1814 that Swiftsure, Lester, master, was one of four merchantmen that American privateers had captured. (The other three were James, McNeil, master, Emulation, and Sir John Sherbrooke. Their crews were landed at Viana.)

Swiftsure's captor was the American privateer schooner Saratoga. Swiftsure was in the company of the schooner James off the Azores. The British vessels engaged Saratoga, which nevertheless prevailed. U.S. records describe Swiftsure as being armed with twelve 32-pounder carronades and two 9-pounder guns, and James as being armed with six 12-pounder carronades and two 18-pounder carronades. Both vessels were carrying fish. The two British vessels initially resisted, but then struck.

Lloyd's List reported on 13 December that Swiftsure, Lester, master, from Newfoundland to Oporto, had been retaken and sent into Bermuda.

| Year | Master | Owner | Trade | Source |
|---|---|---|---|---|
| 1815 | T.Leslie | Crawford | Greenock–Newfoundland | LR; raised 1814; "captured" |
| 1820 | T.Nicholls | Nicholls & Co. | Greenock-St Thomas. | LR; raised 1814 & small repairs 1820 |
| 1825 | Bromfield | Andrew | London | LR; raised 1814 & small repairs 1820 |

By 1828 Swiftsure was sailing between the United Kingdom, New South Wales, and Van Diemen's Land.

| Year | Master | Owner | Trade | Source |
|---|---|---|---|---|
| 1830 | Johnson | Gilmare | London–New South Wales | LR; raised 1814 & good repair 1825 |

== Loss ==
On 4 July 1829 Swiftsure was wrecked at Cape Sidmouth, New South Wales (modern Queensland). Resource rescued all aboard. Swiftsure was on a voyage from New South Wales to Mauritius. The survivors, and part of the cargo, arrived at Mauritius on 17 August.

She was wrecked in the Torres Strait 3.8 nautical miles (7 km) off the Cape York Peninsula, near the mouth of the Lockhart River.

The wreck of Swiftsure was discovered in November 2014. The discovery was officially announced in June 2015.
