= Open Knowledge Base Connectivity =

Open Knowledge Base Connectivity (OKBC) is a protocol and an API for accessing knowledge in knowledge representation systems such as ontology repositories and object–relational databases. It is somewhat complementary to the Knowledge Interchange Format that serves as a general representation language for knowledge. It is developed by SRI International's Artificial Intelligence Center for DARPA's High Performance Knowledge Base program (HPKB).
