= Valuation-based system =

Valuation-based system (VBS) is a framework for knowledge representation and inference. Real-world problems are modeled in this framework by a network of interrelated entities, called variables. The relationships between variables (possibly uncertain or imprecise) are represented by the functions called valuations. The two basic operations for performing inference in a VBS are combination and marginalization. Combination corresponds to the aggregation of knowledge, while marginalization refers to the focusing (coarsening) of it. VBSs were introduced by Prakash P. Shenoy in 1989 as general frameworks for managing uncertainty in expert systems.

== Applications ==
VBS are used for knowledge representation in expert systems and data fusion.

== Bibliography ==
- Shenoy, Prakash P. A valuation-based language for expert systems. Int. Journal of Approximate Reasoning, vol. 3, no. 2, pages 383–411, 1989.
- Shenoy, Prakash P. Valuation based systems: A framework for managing uncertainty in expert systems. In L. A. Zadeh and J. Kacprzyk, editors, Fuzzy Logic and the Management of Uncertainty, chapter 4, pages 83–104. Wiley, New York, 1992.
- Shenoy, Prakash P. and Shafer, G. Axioms for probability and belief-function propagation. In J. Pearl G. Shafer, editor, Readings in uncertain reasoning, pages 575–610. San Mateo, CA: Morgan Kaufmann, 1990.
