= Yahoo Labs =

Yahoo's research arm

Yahoo! Labs
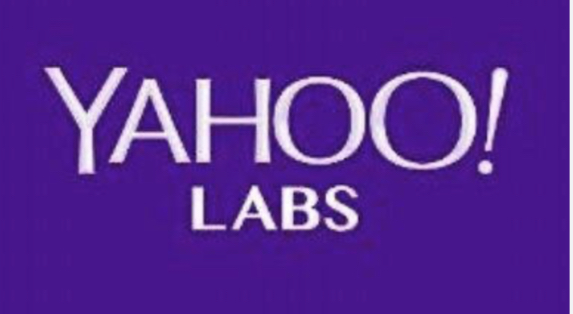
- Formation: March 4, 2008; 18 years ago
- Dissolved: February 17, 2016; 10 years ago
- Location(s): Sunnyvale, California, U.S. New York City, New York, U.S. England, U.K. Haifa, Israel
- Parent organization: Yahoo!
- Staff: 200
- Website: labs.yahoo.com redirects to yahoo.com

Yahoo! Labs was Yahoo!'s research arm that developed technologies used within the company. Yahoo! Labs included approximately 200 employees.

Yahoo! Labs was headquartered in Sunnyvale, CA; it had three additional locations worldwide: New York, London, and Haifa. Yahoo! Labs Barcelona was closed in early 2015.

Yahoo! announced that Yahoo! Labs was being shut down and was subsequently replaced with Yahoo! Research on February 17, 2016.

== History ==
In July 2005, Usama Fayyad (Yahoo!’s Chief Data Officer), Prabhakar Raghavan, Andrew Tomkins, Kevin Lang and other employees who were working for the former "Yahoo! Research Labs" organization formed the new research team. Raghavan was named as Head of Yahoo! Research. Ronald J. Brachman, having finished a term as office director at the Defense Advanced Research Projects Agency (DARPA), joined as the head of worldwide research operations in early September. The team was soon joined by Andrei Broder and Ricardo Baeza-Yates.

Yahoo! Labs was formed in 2008 through a proposal by Ronald Brachman and Larry Heck from the "Yahoo! Search and Advertising Sciences Lab". The proposal combined the two labs into a single organization. In 2012, Ron Brachman took over as head of "Yahoo! Labs" and also became Yahoo's chief scientist.

== Other ventures ==
Yahoo! Labs" also included a group unrelated to research:

=== Academic Partnerships ===
Yahoo Labs partnered with certain academic organizations and schools to assist internal operation in Yahoo Labs.

== Research areas ==
This is a list of areas that Yahoo! Labs researched.

- Advertising science
- Content understanding
- Data science
- Image and video understanding
- Information retrieval
- Machine learning
- Metrics and user engagement
- Natural language and dialogue understanding
- Optimization and feedback control
- Scalable systems
- User modeling and personalization
