= HMS Inconstant =

Six ships of the Royal Navy have been named HMS Inconstant, whilst another was planned:

- HMS Inconstant (1778) was a 36-gun fifth rate, previously the French ship Pallas. She was captured in 1778 and renamed HMS Convert in 1783. She was broken up in 1791.
- HMS Inconstant (1783) was a 36-gun fifth rate launched in 1783 and broken up in 1817.
- HMS Inconstant was planned as a 46-gun fifth-rate. She was ordered in 1825, but was cancelled in 1832.
- HMS Inconstant (1836) was a 36-gun fifth-rate launched in 1836 and sold in 1862.
- HMS Inconstant (1868) was an iron-hulled screw frigate launched in 1868. She was used for harbour service from 1898, was renamed HMS Impregnable II in 1906, merged with HMS Defiance in 1920, renamed HMS Defiance IV in 1922, HMS Defiance II in 1930 and was finally sold in 1956.
- HMS Inconstant (1914) was an Arethusa-class light cruiser launched in 1914 and sold in 1922.
- HMS Inconstant (H49) was a destroyer ordered by Turkey in 1939 but requisitioned while building for the Royal Navy; she was nominally classed with the I-class destroyers, launched in 1941 and returned to Turkey in 1946. The Turks sold her in 1960.
