= Predicate =

Predicate or predication may refer to:

- Predicate (grammar), in linguistics
- Predication (philosophy)
- Several closely related uses in mathematics and formal logic:
  - Predicate (logic)
  - Propositional function
  - Finitary relation, or n-ary predicate
  - Boolean-valued function
  - Syntactic predicate, in formal grammars and parsers
  - Functional predicate
- Predication (computer architecture)
- In United States law, the basis or foundation of something
  - Predicate crime
  - Predicate rules, in the U.S. Title 21 CFR Part 11
- Predicate, a term used in some European context for either nobles' honorifics or for nobiliary particles

== See also ==
- Predicate logic
