= Consistency (knowledge bases) =

A knowledge base KB is consistent iff its negation is not a tautology.

I.e., a knowledge base KB is inconsistent (not consistent) iff there is no interpretation which entails KB.

Example of an inconsistent knowledge base:

KB := { a, ¬a }

Consistency in terms of knowledge bases is mostly the same as the natural understanding of consistency.
