= French brig Inconstant (1811) =

Ship used by Napoleon to escape from Elba

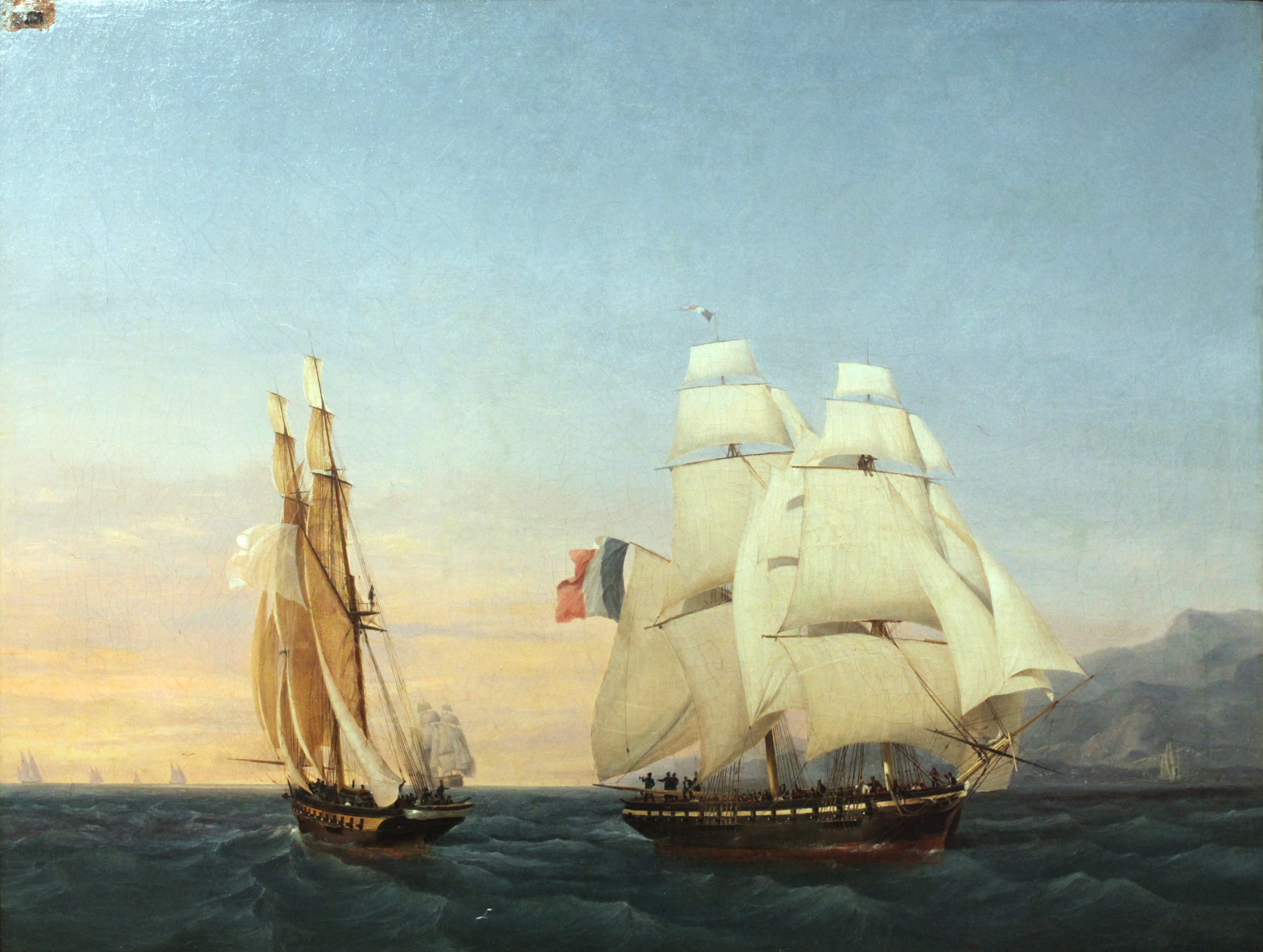
- Retour de l'Île d'Elbe, showing Zéphir and Inconstant, by Jean-François Garneray

History

France
- Name: Inconstant
- Ordered: 6 April 1809
- Builder: Jean-Baptiste Merestier, Livorno
- Laid down: 11 July 1809
- Launched: 28 November 1811
- Fate: Broken up 1843

General characteristics
- Class & type: Sylphe-class brig
- Displacement: 190/374 tons (French)
- Length: 29.23 m (95.9 ft) (overall); 26.31 m (86.3 ft)
- Beam: 8.45 m (27.7 ft)
- Propulsion: Sails
- Sail plan: Brig
- Complement: 1811: 98; 1813:100-159; 1814:60
- Armament: 1811: 16 × 24-pounder carronades + 2 × 6-pounder chase guns; 1815: 18 × 24-pounder carronades

Inconstant was a Sylphe-class brig, one of 21, launched in 1811 for the French Navy. In 1815, Napoleon used her to escape from exile on Elba. In the 1820s she took part in the war with Spain and later served on the Brazil station. She also served on the French Guiana station. She was broken up at Brest in December 1843.

== History ==
Inconstant was built to plans by Jacques-Noël Sané, with Jean-Baptiste Marestier supervising construction. The contract for her construction was signed with St André in April 1809, but was cancelled on 28 January 1810 when she was only 9/24ths complete. The Navy then completed Inconstant's construction.

=== Early service ===
Between 11 November and 29 December 1811 Inconstant was at Livorno, under the command of lieutenant de vaisseau Cornette de Venancourt. then between 27 August and 11 September 1812 she was at Porto Ercole and Portoferraio. She was at Portoferraio on 26 September 1813. On 18 January 1814 she was again at Livorno.

=== Napoleon and the Elban Navy ===
Following the Treaty of Fontainebleau, the victorious allies exiled Emperor Napoleon I to Elba after his forced abdication in 1814. He arrived at Portoferraio on 30 May 1814. He was allowed to keep a personal guard of six hundred men and a small navy.

Inconstant left Toulon on 24 April 1814 to carry Napoleon from St Tropez to Elba, but at Napoleon's insistence, that task fell to the frigate HMS Undaunted. Still, Inconstant sailed to Elba on 25 May 1814 and three days later she was enrolled in his navy. Her role was to maintain his communications with Livorno.

For most of her time with Napoleon, Inconstant was under the command of Lieutenant François-Louis Taillade. She transported Napoleon and 40 troops for the re-occupation and fortification of the islands of Pianosa and Palmaiola. In addition to transporting passengers and mail between Elba and Italy, with her crew augmented by 50 soldiers, she cruised against Barbary pirates. On 6 January 1815 a gale drove Inconstant on shore. She was gotten off, with much difficulty five days later, only to have another storm again drive her ashore, this time causing even more damage. (Note: Inconstant had been painted yellow and grey in 1814, and was repainted in black and white in February 1815 as in Garneray's painting, the "Retour de l'Île d'Elbe". This occurred during her repair and was intended to make her look more like a British brig.) Napoleon temporarily relieved Taillade of command, replacing him with a man named Jean François Chautard. Taillade returned to (shared) command in time for Napoleon's departure from Elba.

On 26 February 1815, Napoleon used Inconstant to escape from exile in Elba. Between 26 February and 1 March 1815 she ferried Napoleon and his generals between Elba and Golfe Juan.

After Napoleon's defeat in the Hundred Days, the French navy reintegrated Inconstant in March 1815. Dryade escorted her to Toulon on 24 May.

=== Return to French naval service ===
The French navy rebuilt Inconstant at Toulon between September 1822 and her relaunching on 14 March 1823.

She then took part in the Spanish expedition in 1823, which restored the monarchy in Spain and put an end to the Trienio Liberal. Inconstant notably recaptured the merchantman Nativité, from Marseilles, on 26 June.

Between 7 April 1823 and 26 November, Inconstant was at Toulon, and then sailed on a mission to Brazil. She was under the command of lieutenant de vaisseau Abel Aubert du Petit-Thouars.

Inconstant was on the Brazil station from 10 December 1823 to 6 March 1826. In August 1824 Inconstant sailed from Rio de Janeiro to Sâo Salvador and then to Pernambuco, where she took up station. By this time Dupetit Thouars had received promotion to capitaine de frégate. By 2 June 1825 Inconstant was back at Rio de Janeiro.

She returned from Brazil and then was at the École navale (Naval School) from 1827 to 1829. From 1 February 1829 to 9 January 1832 Inconstant was on a cruise that took her from Brest to Newfoundland and Brazil. She then underwent a refit in 1834.

Inconstant left Saint Louis, Senegal on 6 February 1835 for France, ferrying officers of Africain. On 8 December 1835 Inconstant departed Brest, bound for Cayenne. She grounded in the Amazon River on 10 January 1836 but managed to refloat herself.

Inconstant was stationed at French Guiana from 1838 to 1840.

== Fate ==
Inconstant was condemned on 17 August 1842. She was broken up in dry dock № 6 at Brest, starting on 4 December 1843.
