= Ronald J. Brachman =

American artificial intelligence researcher

Ronald Jay Brachman
- Born: 1949 (age 76–77)
- Education: Harvard University; Princeton University
- Scientific career
- Workplaces: Harvard University; Yahoo! Research; AT&T Corporation; DARPA
- Thesis: A structural paradigm for representing knowledge (1977)
- Doctoral advisor: William Aaron Woods
- Website: www.brachman.org research.yahoo.com/Ron_Brachman

Ronald Jay "Ron" Brachman (born 1949) is the director of the Jacobs Technion-Cornell Institute at Cornell Tech. Previously, he was the Chief Scientist of Yahoo! and head of Yahoo! Labs (Now Yahoo! Research). Prior to that, he was the Associate Head of Yahoo! Labs and Head of Worldwide Labs and Research Operations.

== Education ==
Brachman earned his B.S.E.E. degree from Princeton University, and his S.M. and Ph.D. degrees from Harvard University.

== Career ==
Prior to working at Yahoo!, Brachman worked at DARPA as the Director of the Information Processing Techniques Office (IPTO), one of DARPA's eight offices at the time. While at IPTO, he helped develop DARPA's Cognitive Systems research efforts. Before that, he worked at AT&T Bell Laboratories (Murray Hill, New Jersey) as the Head of the Artificial Intelligence Principles Research Department (2004) and Director of the Software and Systems Research Laboratory. When AT&T split with Lucent in 1996, he became Communications Services Research Vice President and was one of the founders of AT&T Labs.

He is considered by some to be the godfather of description logic, the logic-based knowledge representation formalism underlying the Web Ontology Language OWL. He was elected a Fellow of the Association for the Advancement of Artificial Intelligence in 1990.

He was a resident of Westfield, New Jersey.

== Publications ==
He is the co-author with Hector Levesque of a popular book on knowledge representation and reasoning and many scientific papers.
