= Rulelog =

Rulelog is an expressive semantic rule-based knowledge representation and reasoning (KRR) language. It underlies knowledge representation languages used in systems such as Flora-2, SILK and others. It extends well-founded declarative logic programs with features for higher-order syntax, frame syntax, defeasibility, general quantified expressions both in the bodies of the rules and their heads, user-defined functions, and restraint bounded rationality.

== Features ==
Rulelog extends well-founded semantics for declarative logic rules with features for higher-order syntax (HiLog), frame syntax (cf. F-Logic), defeasibility (prioritized defaults), general formulas (including existentials and disjunctions in rule heads), user-defined functions, and restraint bounded rationality. Overall, Rulelog combines deep logical/probabilistic reasoning with natural language processing (NLP), and complements machine learning (ML). Rulelog interoperates and composes well with graph databases, relational databases, spreadsheets, XML, RDF/OWL, and can orchestrate overall hybrid KRR. Despite its expressibility, Rulelog is computationally affordable (inferencing is worst-case polynomial time when radial restraint is employed). The more capable and efficient implementations of Rulelog, such as Ergo, Flora-2, and Ontobroker leverage methods from Logic programming, Non-monotonic reasoning, Business rules, the Semantic Web, and Databases. Rulelog implementation methods (in systems like Ergo, Flora-2 and some others) include dependency-aware smart caching of reasoning results (memoization, also known as tabling in logic programming), indexing, and goal reordering (for improving the performance of joins).

== History ==
Rulelog builds on decades of work in Logic Programming and Deductive database research; it combines several different extensions of declarative logic programs whose language and implementations were originally developed by a number of different researchers since 1990's. Many of Rulelog's features derive from earlier systems, including Flora-2, SweetRules, XSB, SWSL, and others.

== Standardization Efforts ==
There was a number of standardization efforts for precursors of Rulelog:

- Semantic Web Services Language was submitted as a member submission to W3C in April, 2005.
- RIF Framework for Logic Dialects (RIF-FLD) is a W3C recommendation, which is intended as a means for formal specification of Web logic languages such as Rulelog.
- Rulelog: Syntax and Semantics. A version of the Rulelog specification using the RIF-FLD framework is standardized by RuleML. The source files for that specification are found here.

== Systems Implementing Rulelog ==
- Flora-2: an open source rule-based system for knowledge representation and reasoning.
- ErgoAI: an implementation of Rulelog by Coherent Knowledge, which includes an IDE and many extensions. This was originally commercial, but has now been available open source (Apache license).
- Sunflower: an integrated development environment for Flora-2.
- SILK: a precursor to Ergo.
- Ontobroker: a commercial implementation of a subset of Rulelog, which is largely based on F-logic with various extensions.
- XSB: supports a smaller subset of Rulelog's features, but a number of other systems, like Flora-2 and Ergo, are based on XSB. Open source.

== See also ==
- RuleML
- Flora-2
- Ontology (computer science)
- Semantic Web Rule Language
