= Vladimir Lifschitz =

American computer scientist

Vladimir Lifschitz (born 30 May 1947) is the Gottesman Family Centennial Professor in Computer Sciences at the University of Texas at Austin. He received a degree in mathematics from the Steklov Institute of Mathematics in Russia in 1971 and emigrated to the United States in 1976. Lifschitz's research interests are in the areas of computational logic and knowledge representation. He is a Fellow of the Association for the Advancement of Artificial Intelligence, the Editor-in-Chief of the ACM Transactions on Computational Logic, and an Editorial Advisor of the journal Theory and Practice of Logic Programming.

He, together with Michael Gelfond, defined stable model semantics for logic programs, which later became the theoretical foundation for Answer Set Programming, a new declarative programming paradigm.
