= Knowledge processing for robots =

Knowledge representation framework

KnowRob (Knowledge processing for robots) is a system which combines knowledge representation and reasoning methods to acquire and ground knowledge. This system is the backbone of openEASE. both under developing at the Institute for Artificial Intelligence at the University of Bremen, Germany.

== The framework ==
KnowRob can serve as a common sense framework for the integration of knowledge. This knowledge can be static encyclopedic knowledge, common sense knowledge, task descriptions, environment models, object information, observed actions, etc., which can come from different sources, like manually axiomatized, derived from observations, or imported from the web.

KnowRob has been used by different research groups, as the Rice University using the ontological knowledge base in a robotic platform. As well by the Eindhoven University of Technology research group competing in the RoboCup league, in the "at Home" category, with the RoboEarth project.

As well, KnowRob is mentioned in the work of some research groups from the Lucian Blaga University of Sibiu, Middle East Technical University in their combination of different knowledge bases, Keio University as related work because of the ontology service, University of Texas at Austin as related work as well because of the relation with the work presented, Hanyang University as related work as an OWL based knowledge processing framework.

== Representations ==
To represent the knowledge, KnowRob uses the OWL ontology language and an extended first-order logic knowledge representation with computable predicates. To give the order of subactions, KnowRob includes a pair-wise ordering constrain, which gives a partial ordering.

KnowRob adopts the closed-world assumption Prolog, and an open-world assumption by the use of computables. To include reasoning rules into Prolog, KnowRob uses an inference procedure beyond the capabilities of OWL to extract information about tasks executions.

In its second version, KnowRob provides a logic interface to the hybrid reasoning kernel as a logic based language. This language presents the hybrid reasoning kernel as if everything were entities retrievable by providing partial descriptions for them. This entities descriptions include objects, their parts, and articulation models, environments composed of objects, software components, actions, and events.

=== Episodic memories ===
Episodic memory is related to the experience information, which is organized temporally and spatially, alongside combined with context information. In KnowRob, an episodic memory is understood as a recording that the agent makes of the ongoing activity, which includes very detailed information about the actions, motions, their purposes, effects and the behavior they generate, it also includes the images captured during execution, etc.

== Usage ==
The knowledge is computed by external methods using Prolog queries. In the second version of the KnowRob system, is included a better structure of the packages and documentations. Which includes some extensions from the previous version, as well as a logic based language. For example, a cup description from perception can be represented in this language as:

 entity(Cup,[an, object, [type, cup],
 [shape, cylinder], [color, orange]])

As well, a controller could represent the same object as:

 entity(Cup, [an, object, [type, cup],
 [proper_physical_parts, [an, object,
 [type, handle], [grasp−pose, G−pose]]]])

The interface language is comparable to other query languages for symbolic knowledge bases. KnowRob's query language integrates reasoning methods, such as the simulation-based reasoning.

== Goals ==
The goal of the KnowRob framework is to make semantic knowledge available for service robots. It is able to answer queries about missing information in vague instructions for tasks. This is possible with the actions hierarchical representation and information about objects which can be included in certain action.
