= Nixon diamond =

Reasoning process

In nonmonotonic reasoning, the Nixon diamond is a scenario in which default assumptions lead to mutually inconsistent conclusions. The scenario is:

- usually, Quakers are pacifist
- usually, Republicans are not pacifist
- Richard Nixon is both a Quaker and a Republican

Since Nixon is a Quaker, one could assume that he is a pacifist; since he is Republican, however, one could also assume he is not a pacifist. The problem is how a formal logic of nonmonotonic reasoning should deal with such cases. Two approaches can be adopted:

- skeptical : since Nixon can neither be proved to be a pacifist nor the contrary, no conclusion is drawn
- credulous : since Nixon can be proved to be a pacifist in at least one case, he is believed to be a pacifist; however, since he can also be proved not to be a pacifist, he is also believed not to be a pacifist

The credulous approach can allow proving both something and its contrary. For this reason, the skeptical approach is often preferred. Another solution to this problem is to attach priorities to default assumptions; for example, the fact that “usually, Republicans are not pacifist” can be assumed more likely than “usually, Quakers are pacifist”, leading to the conclusion that Nixon is not pacifist.

The name "diamond" comes from the fact that such a scenario, when expressed as a belief network, forms a diamond shape. This example is mentioned for the first time by Reiter and Criscuolo in a slightly different form where the person that is both a Republican and a Quaker is a John instead of Richard Nixon.

== See also ==
- Default logic
- Multiple inheritance
