= Defeasible =

Defeasible may refer to:

- Defeasibility (linguistics), the ability of an implicature or presupposition to be cancelled
- Defeasible reasoning, a type of convincing but not demonstrative philosophical reasoning
- Defeasible logic, a non-monotonic logic to formalize defeasible reasoning
- Defeasible estate, an estate created when a grantor transfers land conditionally
