= Michael Gelfond =

American computer scientist

Michael Gelfond is a Professor in Computer Sciences at Texas Tech University in the United States. He received a degree in mathematics from the Steklov Institute of Mathematics in Russia in 1974 and immigrated to the United States in 1978. Gelfond's research interests are in the areas of computational logic and knowledge representation. He is a Fellow of the Association for the Advancement of Artificial Intelligence, and an Area Editor (in Knowledge Representation and Nonmonotonic Reasoning) of the journal Theory and Practice of Logic Programming.

He, together with Vladimir Lifschitz, defined stable model semantics for logic programs, which later became the theoretical foundation for Answer Set Programming, a new declarative programming paradigm.
