= Unique name assumption =

The unique name assumption is a simplifying assumption made in some ontology languages and description logics. In logics with the unique name assumption, different names always refer to different entities in the world. It was included in Ray Reiter's discussion of the closed-world assumption often tacitly included in Database Management Systems (e.g. SQL) in his 1984 article "Towards a logical reconstruction of relational database theory" (in M. L. Brodie, J. Mylopoulos, J. W. Schmidt (editors), Data Modelling in Artificial Intelligence, Database and Programming Languages, Springer, 1984, pages 191–233).

The standard ontology language OWL does not make this assumption, but provides explicit constructs to express whether two names denote the same or distinct entities.

- owl:sameAs is the OWL property that asserts that two given names or identifiers (e.g., URIs) refer to the same individual or entity.
- owl:differentFrom is the OWL property that asserts that two given names or identifiers (e.g., URIs) refer to different individuals or entities.

== See also ==
- Closed-world assumption
- Coreference
