= NeOn Toolkit =

The NeOn Toolkit is an open source, multi-platform ontology editor, which supports the development of ontologies in F-Logic and OWL/RDF. The editor is based on the Eclipse platform and provides a set of plug-ins (currently 20 plug-ins are available for the latest version, v2.4) covering a number of ontology engineering activities, including Annotation and Documentation, Modularization and Customization, Reuse, Ontology Evolution, translation and others.

The NeOn Toolkit has been developed in the course of the EU-funded NeOn project and is currently maintained and distributed by the NeOn Technologies Foundation.
