= Defeasible logic =

Non-monotonic logic of strict, defeasible rules and undercutting defeaters

Defeasible logic is a non-monotonic logic proposed by Donald Nute to formalize defeasible reasoning. In defeasible logic, there are three different types of propositions:

strict rules
specify that a fact is always a consequence of another;
defeasible rules
specify that a fact is typically a consequence of another;
undercutting defeaters
specify exceptions to defeasible rules.

A priority ordering over the defeasible rules and the defeaters can be given. During the process of deduction, the strict rules are always applied, while a defeasible rule can be applied only if no defeater of a higher priority specifies that it should not.

== See also ==
- Common sense
- Default logic
