= Transaction logic =

Transaction Logic is an extension of predicate logic that accounts in a clean and declarative way for the phenomenon of state changes in logic programs and databases. This extension adds connectives specifically designed for combining simple actions into complex transactions and for providing control over their execution. The logic has a natural model theory and a sound and complete proof theory. Transaction Logic has a Horn clause subset, which has a procedural as well as a declarative semantics. The important features of the logic include hypothetical and committed updates, dynamic constraints on transaction execution, non-determinism, and bulk updates. In this way, Transaction Logic is able to declaratively capture a number of non-logical phenomena, including procedural knowledge in artificial intelligence, active databases, and methods with side effects in object databases.

Transaction Logic was originally proposed in 1993 by Anthony Bonner and Michael Kifer and later described in more detail in An Overview of Transaction Logic and Logic Programming for Database Transactions. The most comprehensive description appears in Bonner & Kifer's technical report from 1995.

In later years, Transaction Logic was extended in various ways, including concurrency, defeasible reasoning, partially defined actions, and other features.

In 2013, the original paper on Transaction Logic has won the 20-year Test of Time Award of the Association for Logic Programming as the most influential paper from the proceedings of ICLP 1993 conference in the preceding 20 years.

== Examples ==
=== Graph coloring ===
Here tinsert denotes the elementary update operation of transactional insert. The connective ⊗ is called serial conjunction.

colorNode <-  // color one node correctly
    node(N) ⊗ ¬ colored(N,_) ⊗ color(C)
    ⊗ ¬(adjacent(N,N2) ∧ colored(N2,C))
    ⊗ tinsert(colored(N,C)).
colorGraph <- ¬uncoloredNodesLeft.
colorGraph <- colorNode ⊗ colorGraph.

=== Pyramid stacking ===
The elementary update tdelete represents the transactional delete operation.

stack(N,X) <- N>0 ⊗ move(Y,X) ⊗ stack(N-1,Y).
stack(0,X).
move(X,Y) <- pickup(X) ⊗ putdown(X,Y).
pickup(X) <- clear(X) ⊗ on(X,Y) ⊗
             ⊗ tdelete(on(X,Y)) ⊗ tinsert(clear(Y)).
putdown(X,Y) <-  wider(Y,X) ⊗ clear(Y) 
                 ⊗ tinsert(on(X,Y)) ⊗ tdelete(clear(Y)).

=== Hypothetical execution ===
Here <> is the modal operator of possibility: If both action1 and action2 are possible, execute action1. Otherwise, if only action2 is possible, then execute it.

execute <- <>action1 ⊗ <>action2 ⊗ action1.
execute <- ¬<>action1 ⊗ <>action2 ⊗ action2.

=== Dining philosophers ===
Here | is the logical connective of parallel conjunction of Concurrent Transaction Logic.

diningPhilosophers <- phil(1) | phil(2) | phil(3) | phil(4).

== Implementations ==
A number of implementations of Transaction Logic exist:

- The original implementation.
- An implementation of Concurrent Transaction Logic.
- Transaction Logic enhanced with tabling. An implementation of Transaction Logic has also been incorporated as part of the Flora-2 knowledge representation and reasoning system.

All these implementations are open source.
