= Flora-2 =

Logic-based programming language

Flora-2 is an open source semantic rule-based system for knowledge representation and reasoning. The language of the system is derived from F-logic, HiLog, and Transaction logic. Being based on F-logic and HiLog implies that object-oriented syntax and higher-order representation are the major features of the system. Flora-2 also supports a form of defeasible reasoning called Logic Programming with Defaults and Argumentation Theories (LPDA). Applications include intelligent agents, Semantic Web, knowledge-bases networking, ontology management, integration of information, security policy analysis, automated database normalization, and more.

Flora-2 relies on the XSB system for its inference engine. The design and architecture of Flora-2 are described in a number of works.

Details of the system and its use are described in the Flora-2 User's Manual. Flora-2 is available for all major computing platforms, including Linux and other flavors of Unix, Microsoft Windows, and Mac OS X.

== History ==
Flora-2 is a successor to the Flora system (1998–1999) and incorporates the experience gained developing and using the original Flora system. The Flora-2 project started around year 2000 by Guizhen Yang and Michael Kifer. In later years it was led by Michael Kifer and had many other contributors. In 2023, Flora-2 became a subset of the core ErgoAI engine, a reasoning engine developed and maintained by the Coherent Knowledge company.

== Projects using Flora-2 ==
- TaOPiS is a social semantic Web application for supporting self-organizing communities.
- Baze is a database development environment similar to Access and Base.
- ReasonablePython is a module which adds F-Logic to Python.
- The FRDCSA project is developing an extension to the Perl XSB interface for supporting access to Flora-2 and HiLog from Perl and the FreeKBS3 system.
