= Raymond Reiter =

Canadian computer scientist and logician (1939–2002)

Raymond Reiter FRSC
- Born: June 12, 1939
- Died: September 16, 2002 (aged 63)
- Education: University of Michigan (PhD)
- Awards: ACM Fellow; AAAI Fellow; IJCAI Award for Research Excellence
- Scientific career
- Fields: Non-monotonic logic
- Workplaces: University of Toronto
- Thesis: A Study of a Model for Parallel Computations (1967)
- Doctoral advisor: Harvey Garner; Richard M. Karp
- Doctoral students: Sheila McIlraith

Raymond Reiter FRSC (/ˈraɪtər/; June 12, 1939 – September 16, 2002) was a Canadian computer scientist and logician. He was one of the founders of the field of non-monotonic reasoning with his work on default logic, model-based diagnosis, closed-world reasoning, and truth maintenance systems. He also contributed to the situation calculus.

== Awards and honors ==
He was a Fellow of the Association for Computing Machinery (ACM), an AAAI Fellow, and a Fellow of the Royal Society of Canada. He won the IJCAI Award for Research Excellence in 1993.

== Publications ==
- R. Reiter (1978). On closed world data bases. In H. Gallaire and J. Minker, editors, Logic and Data Bases, pages 119–140. Plenum., New York.
- R. Reiter (1980). A logic for default reasoning. Artificial Intelligence, 13:81-132.
- R. Reiter (1987). A theory of diagnosis from first principles. Artificial Intelligence, 32:57-95.
- R. Reiter (1991). The frame problem in the situation calculus: a simple solution (sometimes) and a completeness result for goal regression. In Vladimir Lifschitz, editor, Artificial Intelligence and Mathematical Theory of Computation: Papers in Honor of John McCarthy, pages 359–380. Academic Press, New York.
- R. Reiter (2001) Knowledge in Action: Logical Foundations for Specifying and Implementing Dynamical Systems (448 pp.). The MIT Press, Cambridge, Massachusetts and London, England.
- R. Reiter and J. de Kleer (1987). Foundations of assumption-based truth maintenance systems: Preliminary report. In Proceedings of the Sixth National Conference on Artificial Intelligence (AAAI'87), pages 183–188.
- H. Levesque, F. Pirri, and R. Reiter (1998). Foundations for the situation calculus Electronic Transactions on Artificial Intelligence, 2(3–4):159-178.
- F. Pirri and R. Reiter (1999). Some contributions to the metatheory of the Situation Calculus Journal of the ACM, 46(3):325–361. doi:10.1145/316542.316545
