= XSB =

- Paradigm: Logic Programming
- Designed by: David S. Warren, Theresa Swift, Kostis Sagonas
- Stable release: 5.0 / 12 May 2022; 4 years ago
- OS: Cross-platform
- Filename extensions: .P
- Website: xsb.sf.net

Influenced by
- Prolog, PSB-Prolog, SB-Prolog

XSB is the name of a dialect of the Prolog programming language and its implementation developed at Stony Brook University in collaboration with the Katholieke Universiteit Leuven, the New University of Lisbon, Uppsala University and software vendor XSB, Inc.

XSB extends Prolog with tabled resolution and HiLog.

== Features ==
XSB is a compiled dialect of Prolog based on the Warren Abstract Machine. Unlike systems derived from Quintus, XSB uses a module system based on Prolog atoms. It features tabled resolution and supports the HiLog language (permitting limited higher-order logic programming). Tabling enables XSB to implement the well-founded semantics and makes it suitable as a deductive database engine. The open source XSB implementation includes an interface to the Python programming language.

== History ==
XSB was originally developed at Stony Brook University by David S. Warren, Theresa Swift, and Kostis Sagonas and launched in 1993-4. It was based on the SB-Prolog language that was also developed at Stony Brook University in 1986, and it was the first implementation of tabled resolution.

== Syntax ==
XSB supports the ISO-mandated Prolog data types such as integers, floating point numbers, and atoms. Integers in XSB can be interpreted in multiple bases. By default integers are interpreted in base 10 but can be interpreted in a range of bases from 2 to 36.

== See also ==
- Comparison of Prolog implementations
- Prolog syntax and semantics
