= Well-founded semantics =

Semantics for logic programming

In computer science, the well-founded semantics is a three-valued semantics for logic programming, which gives a precise meaning to general logic programs.

== History ==
The well-founded semantics was defined by Van Gelder, et al. in 1988. The Prolog system XSB implements the well-founded semantics since 1997.

== Three-valued logic ==
The well-founded semantics assigns a unique model to every general logic program. However, instead of only assigning propositions true or false, it adds a third value unknown for representing ignorance.

A simple example is the logic program that encodes two propositions a and b, and in which a must be true whenever b is not and vice versa:

a :- not(b).
b :- not(a).

neither a nor b are true or false, but both have the truth value unknown. In the two-valued stable model semantics, there are two stable models, one in which a is true and b is false, and one in which b is true and a is false.

Stratified logic programs have a 2-valued well-founded model, in which every proposition is either true or false. This coincides with the unique stable model of the program. The well-founded semantics can be viewed as a three-valued version of the stable model semantics.

== Complexity ==
In 1989, Van Gelder suggested an algorithm to compute the well-founded semantics of a propositional logic program whose time complexity is quadratic in the size of the program. As of 2001, no general subquadratic algorithm for the problem was known.
