= CLP(R) =

Constraint logic programming over rational and real numbers

CLP(R) is a declarative programming language. It stands for constraint logic programming (real) where real refers to the real numbers. It can be considered and is generally implemented as a superset or add-on package for a Prolog implementation.

== Example rule ==
The simultaneous linear equations:

$$\begin{cases}
3x + 4y - 2z = 8\\
x - 5y + z = 10\\
2x + 3y -z = 20
\end{cases}$$

are expressed in CLP(R) as:

3*X + 4*Y - 2*Z = 8,
X - 5*Y + Z = 10,
2*X + 3*Y -Z = 20.

and a typical implementation's response would be:

Z = 35.75
Y = 8.25
X = 15.5

Yes

== Example program ==
CLP(R) allows the definition of predicates using recursive definitions. For example a mortgage relation can be defined as relating the principal P, the number of time periods of the loan T, the repayment each period R, the interest rate per period I and the final balance owing at the end of the loan B.

mg(P, T, R, I, B) :- T = 0, B = P.
mg(P, T, R, I, B) :- T >= 1, P1 = P*(1+I) - R, mg(P1, T - 1, R, I, B).

The first rule expresses that for a 0 period loan the balance owing at the end is simply the original principal. The second rule expresses that for a loan of at least one time period we can calculate the new owing amount P1 by multiplying the principal by 1 plus the interest rate and subtracting the repayment. The remainder of the loan is treated as another mortgage for the new principal and one less time period.

What can you do with it? You can ask many questions. If I borrow 1000$ for 10 years at 10% per year repaying 150 per year, how much will I owe at the end?

?- mg(1000, 10, 150, 10/100, B).

The system responds with the answer

B = 203.129.

How much can I borrow with a 10 year loan at 10% repaying 150 each year to owe nothing at the end?

?- mg(P, 10, 150, 10/100, 0).

The system responds with the answer

P = 921.685.

What is the relationship between the principal, repayment and balance on a 10 year loan at 10% interest?

?- mg(P, 10, R, 10/100, B).

The system responds with the answer

P = 0.3855*B + 6.1446 * R.

This shows the relationship between the variables, without requiring any to take a particular value.

== Prolog Integration ==
CLP(R) has first been integrated into a Prolog system in 1994, namely into SICStus Prolog. This implementation has since been ported to many popular Prolog systems, including Ciao, SWI-Prolog and XSB.

== See also ==
- Comparison of Prolog implementations
- Prolog syntax and semantics
