= ECLiPSe =

Constraint logic programming system

ECLiPSe Constraint Logic Programming System
- Developers: European Computer‐Industry Research Centre (ECRC), Munich; Centre for Planning and Resource Control, Imperial College London (IC-Parc); Cisco Systems
- Release: 1992; 34 years ago
- Stable release: 7.0 / January 22, 2018; 8 years ago
- Written in: C, Prolog
- Operating system: Cross-platform
- Available in: English
- Type: Constraint logic programming
- License: Mozilla Public (MPL)
- Website: eclipseclp.org
- Repository: sf.net/p/eclipse-clp/git/

ECLiPSe is a software system for the development and deployment of constraint logic programming applications, e.g., in the areas of optimization, planning, scheduling, resource allocation, timetabling, transport, etc. It is also suited for teaching most aspects of combinatorial problem solving, e.g., problem modeling, constraint programming, mathematical programming, and search techniques. It contains constraint solver libraries, a high-level modeling and control language (a superset of Prolog), interfaces to third-party solvers, an integrated development environment and interfaces for embedding into host environments.

ECLiPSe was developed until 1995 at the European Computer‐Industry Research Centre (ECRC) in Munich, and then until 2005 at the Centre for Planning and Resource Control at Imperial College London (IC-Parc). It was purchased by Cisco Systems. In September 2006, it was released as open source software under an equivalent of the Mozilla Public License, and is now hosted on SourceForge

== Language ==
The ECLiPSe language is largely backward-compatible with Prolog and supports different dialects, including ISO Prolog. Due to being declarative, it can be used both as a modelling language to describe problems, and as a general purpose programming language.

Beyond the basic Prolog data types, the following are available: strings, unlimited precision integer and rational numbers, and floating point intervals. Array syntax and structures with field names are also supported and especially useful in constraint modelling.

A logical iteration construct eliminates the need for most simple recursion patterns.

ECLiPSe provides comprehensive facilities to implement data-driven control behaviour. These include declarative delay-clauses as well as primitives for meta-programmed control like explicit goal suspension, flexible triggering facilities and execution priorities. Together with the attributed variable data type, this is the key to many extensions to the basic logic programming language, including all constraint-based functionality. The system calls user-definable event handlers when it encounters attributed variables in certain contexts, e.g. unification.

The module system controls the visibility of predicates, non-logical stores, source transformations and syntax settings. Module interfaces can be extended and restricted, and modules written in different language dialects can be mixed within one application.

Programs may contain structured comments from which reference documentation can be generated.

== Libraries ==
ECLiPSe provides several libraries of constraint solvers which can be used in application programs:

Arithmetic constraints over finite domains, finite set constraints, generalized propagation, interval reasoning over non-linear constraints, interfaces to external simplex solvers, constraint handling rules (CHR) and more.

Other libraries implement search methods like branch-and-bound, repair-based search, limited discrepancy search.

ECLiPSe interfaces to external solvers, in particular the COIN-OR, CPLEX, Gurobi, and Xpress-MP linear and mixed-integer programming solvers, and the Gecode solver library.

Compatibility libraries for ISO Prolog and other Prolog dialects (C-Prolog, Quintus, SICStus, SWI-Prolog) enable the reuse of libraries written in those dialects.

Other utility libraries, including a number of popular public domain ones, are included in the distribution.

== System architecture ==
The system includes an incremental compiler which translates source code into virtual machine code. The compiler optimizes index selection, unification order, inlining of control constructs and can take mode information into account.

The runtime system implements the virtual machine, automatic memory management with garbage collection of stacks and dictionary, event handling and data-driven execution. Versions of ECLiPSe implement OR-parallelism.

ECLiPSe components can be integrated into software via a low-level C or C++ interface, or via high-level interfaces to Java and Tcl.

== Industrial applications ==
A notable Prolog application was the online casino games server of the Global Player Casino. It has used Prolog as its standard implemention language with more than 157,000 lines of Prolog code running on ECLiPSe.

Originally, it was planned to use Prolog only as a rapid prototyping language and after the main design will be verified, it would be rewritten in C. However it turned out that no C rewriting was necessary, the Prolog program has managed to serve ten thousands of HTTP requests per second. All it needed was an interface to the commercial Informix database, the first prototype did not need even that.

The server has implemented several versions of single and multi-player roulette and blackjack, several types of slot machines and all credit card operations. It was even able to organize multiplayer blackjack tournaments each week. Unfortunately, although players have loved all these gimmicks, the casino management was not able to advertise it well enough and so the casino went bust in 2007.

The reasons for such a success of Prolog as industrial implementation language were:

- It turned out that Prolog is almost ideal for rapid prototyping.
- The program is its own executable specification.
- An internal relational database is always available.
- Starting with a very simple prototype takes at most hours, not weeks.
- New functionalities can be added incrementally, until the required level is achieved.

== See also ==
- Comparison of Prolog implementations
- Prolog syntax and semantics
