= Prolog++ =

Prolog++ is an object-oriented toolkit for the Prolog logic programming language. It allows classes and class hierarchies to be created within Prolog programs.

Prolog++ was developed by LPA and first released in 1989 for MS-DOS PCs. Support for other platforms was added, and a second version was released in 1995. A book entitled 'Prolog++ The Power of Object-Oriented and Logic Programming' by Chris Moss was published by Addison-Wesley in 1994.

Currently, Prolog++ is available as an add-on to LPA Prolog for Windows.

Three other approaches to object-oriented Prolog include PDC Visual Prolog (once known as Borland Turbo Prolog), SICStus Prolog and the almost implementation-neutral Logtalk framework.

== See also ==
- Logtalk
- Visual Prolog
- Comparison of Prolog implementations
- Prolog syntax and semantics
