= Prolog32 =

Arity/Prolog32 is an extended version of Prolog, a logic programming language associated with artificial intelligence and computational linguistics. It was originally developed at the Arity Corporation by Peter Gabel, Paul Weiss and Jim Greene.

Arity/Prolog32 allows a developer to create and execute Prolog programs for Windows, which are also operable on Linux using WINE. The software includes a compiler and interpreter written in Prolog, C, Assembler. The interpreter provides debugging support, and can be invoked from compiled code for applications that require dynamically modifiable code. It can either produce stand-alone programs, dynamic-link libraries, or applications where the code becomes subjugated within another system (one written, for example, in C). The software has been applied in various ways across a range of industries. For example, in the clothing industry, it was used to address differentials in quantity related to size, while in education, it provided a semi-automatic tool for teaching aids. A grammatical analyzer was implemented with SWI-Prolog, and after it was tested and analyzed with the Airty/Prolog32 interpreter and in the study of protein folding simulation.

== See also ==
- Comparison of Prolog implementations
- Prolog syntax and semantics
