= Quintus Prolog =

Prolog programming language implementation

- Developer(s): Swedish Institute of Computer Science
- Initial release: 1984
- Final release: 3.5 / 29 December 2003; 21 years ago
- Type: Prolog implementation
- License: Proprietary
- Website: quintus.sics.se

Quintus Prolog is a proprietary implementation of the Prolog programming language based on the Warren Abstract Machine. Originally developed by Quintus Computer Systems, it is currently maintained by SICS. It was long known as the most highly-performing implementation of Prolog, and the early 1990s, it defined a de facto standard for Prolog implementations.

== History ==
Quintus Prolog was first introduced in 1984 as an implementation of the recently proposed Warren Abstract Machine by Quintus Computer Systems, which had been founded for this purpose by David H. D. Warren, William Kornfeld, Lawrence Byrd, Fernando Pereira and Cuthbert Hurd. Quintus was sold to Intergraph Corporation in 1989, and was eventually acquired by SICS in 1998. After several of its features were amalgamated into their Prolog implementation SICStus, its final version release was Quintus 3.5 in 2003. As of November 2023, Quintus is still maintained by SICS.

== Features ==
The syntax used by Quintus Prolog was based on that of DEC-10 Prolog. It was long known as the most highly performing implementation of Prolog, and was the first to implement optimisations such as instruction merging and specialisation for the Warren Abstract Machine.

== Legacy ==
Prolog implementations and their mutual influences

Quintus Prolog rose to a de facto standard, and significantly influenced the ISO standard for Prolog developed in 1995/6. In addition, while the module system envisaged by the ISO standard deviates from that of Quintus, the Quintus module system is in fact more widely adopted by modern Prolog implementations than that mandated by ISO. Several other popular Prolog systems, both commercial and research-based, are directly influenced by Quintus Prolog, including SICStus, SWI-Prolog, YAP and Ciao.

== See also ==
- Comparison of Prolog implementations
- Prolog syntax and semantics
