= GNU Prolog =

- Developer: Daniel Diaz
- Stable release: 1.5.0 / July 8, 2021; 5 years ago
- Written in: C
- Operating system: Linux, Solaris, Windows, BSD, Mac OS X
- Type: Compiler
- License: GNU General Public License v2 (or above) or GNU Lesser General Public License v3 (or above) or both in parallel
- Website: www.gprolog.org
- Repository: github.com/didoudiaz/gprolog

GNU Prolog (also called gprolog) is a compiler developed by Daniel Diaz with an interactive debugging environment for Prolog available for Unix, Windows, Mac OS X and Linux. It also supports some extensions to Prolog including constraint programming over a finite domain, parsing using definite clause grammars, and an operating system interface.

The compiler converts the source code into byte code that can be interpreted by a Warren abstract machine (WAM) and converts that to standalone executables.

== See also ==
- SWI-Prolog
- Comparison of Prolog implementations
- Prolog syntax and semantics
