= Strand (programming language) =

High-level language for parallel computing

Strand is a high-level symbolic language for parallel computing, similar in syntax to Prolog.

Artificial Intelligence Ltd were awarded the British Computer Society Award for Technical Innovation 1989 for Strand88. The language was created by computer scientists Ian Foster and Stephen Taylor.

== Implementations ==
Felix Winkelmann's web site - Strand, Felix Winkelmann's GitLab repository

== See also ==
- Comparison of Prolog implementations
- Prolog syntax and semantics
