= YAP (Prolog) =

Programming language implementation

YAP Prolog
- Stable release: 6.3.3 / 21 January 2013; 13 years ago
- Preview release: 7.1 / 9 January 2016; 10 years ago
- Operating system: Linux, Windows, Solaris, Mac OS X
- Platform: Programming language
- License: Perl Artistic License 2.0
- Website: www.dcc.fc.up.pt/~vsc/yap/
- Repository: github.com/vscosta/yap

YAP (Yet Another Prolog viz. implementation) is a high-performance free implementation of the Prolog programming language, developed jointly at the Artificial Intelligence and Computer Science Laboratory (LIACC) of University of Porto and at Federal University of Rio de Janeiro's COPPE Institute's Systems Engineering and Computer Science graduate program. Its Prolog engine is based upon the Warren Abstract Machine (WAM), containing several optimizations aimed at increased performance. YAP follows the Edinburgh tradition and is largely compatible with the ISO-Prolog standard and with Quintus Prolog and SICStus Prolog. The original version, developed in 1985, was written in Motorola 68000 Assembly, C and Prolog, having achieved high performance on m68k-based machines.

== See also ==
- Comparison of Prolog implementations
- Prolog syntax and semantics
