= Swedish Institute of Computer Science =

Swedish research institute

- Established: 1985; 41 years ago
- Focus: Applied computer science
- Head: Ingrid Nordmark
- Faculty: 160 researchers
- Staff: 200 employees total
- Address: Box 1263, SE-164 29 Kista, Sweden
- Location: Kista district, Stockholm, Uppland, Sweden
- Website: www.sics.se

RISE SICS (previously Swedish Institute of Computer Science) is a leading research institute for applied information and communication technology in Sweden.

== Background ==
SICS was founded in 1985 in cooperation with KTH in Kista at the initiative of Ericsson and Televerket. The creation of SICS was a response to the creation of the Institute for New Generation Computer Technology (ICOT) by Japan's Ministry of International Trade and Industry (MITI). At this time similar organizations were created in the United States (Microelectronics and Computer Technology Corporation) and in the European Commonwealth (European Strategic Programme on Research in Information Technology and European Center for Research & Consultancy). The main driving force was that Japan had started to create Fifth Generation Computer Systems, that using massive parallelism in hardware and a strong focus on the programming language Prolog had set out to create computers capable of communication in natural languages.

One of the first projects initiated by SICS was related to parallel execution of Prolog, and already in the first year of activity SICS initiated development of a Prolog implementation named SICStus Prolog, featuring a Prolog-dialect, a compiler and a virtual machine. Around 1991 this implementation started to see use in the field of constraint programming.

SICS today explores the digitalization of products, services and businesses.

In January 2005, SICS had about 88 employees, of whom 77 were researchers, 30 with PhD degrees. As of April 2016, SICS had about 200 employees, of which 160 were researchers, 83 with PhD degrees. The institute is headquartered in the Kista district of Stockholm, with the main office in the Electrum building.

== Software ==
Several well-known software packages have been developed at SICS:

- Contiki, an operating system for small-memory embedded devices
- Delegent, an authorization server
- Distributed Interactive Virtual Environment or DIVE in short
- lwIP, a TCP/IP stack for embedded systems
- Oz-Mozart, a multi-platform programming system
- Nemesis, a concept exokernel operating system
- Protothreads, light-weight stackless threads
- Quintus Prolog and SICStus Prolog, Prolog implementations
- Simics, a full-system simulator originally developed at SICS
- uIP, a TCP/IP stack for embedded systems

== Academic output ==
The research at SICS results in approximately 100 refereed publications in academic journals, conferences and workshops per year. Around 2-4 SICS researchers receive higher academic degrees per year, and 1-3 persons move to academia for tenured positions.

SICS was ranked as the 15th most acknowledged computer science research institution in the world in an article in the December 2004 issue of the highly esteemed journal Proceedings of the National Academy of Sciences (PNAS). SICS is the only Swedish institution included in the list, and is one of two European institutions (the other one is INRIA) alongside 13 well-known American institutions, several of them larger than SICS.

== Notable spin-off companies ==
- Dynarc (1997)
- Effnet (1997)
- Virtutech (1998)
- PipeBeach (1998)
- Tacton Systems (1998) - knowledge based solutions for sales and product configuration
- BotBox (1999)
- Voxi (1999)
- VerySolid (2004)
- Axiomatics (2006) - security solutions for digital data assets
- Asimus (2006) - search technology
- Peerialism (2007) - scalable and flexible file storage and video streaming solutions
- Gavagai (2008) - scalable and robust representation of semantics of linguistic data

== Funding ==
SICS is owned jointly, 60% by the Swedish government, and 40% by Swedish industry. The government owners are the Research Institutes of Sweden (RISE), Swedish ICT, and the Defence Materiel Administration (FMV). The industry owners are a consortium of Ericsson, Asea Brown Boveri (ABB), Saab Group, Green Cargo, Bombardier Transportation, and TeliaSonera.

SICS research is funded by the owners, by national funding sources, often Vinnova (the Swedish Government Agency for Innovation Systems) and the Swedish Foundation for Strategic Research (SSF), and by industrial collaboration partners. SICS also participates in several European research projects funded by the European Commission.
