= KL0 =

Kernel Language 0 (KL0) is a sequential logic programming language based on Prolog, used in the ICOT Fifth generation computer project.

== See also ==
- Comparison of Prolog implementations
- Prolog syntax and semantics
