= Adam Dunkels =

Swedish computer scientist

- Born: 28 May 1978 (age 47); Luleå, Sweden
- Education: Swedish Institute of Computer Science (B.S.; M.S., 2001; PhD, 2007)
- Known for: Contiki, lwIP, uIP, protothreads
- Parents: Andrejs Dunkels (father); Kerstin Vännman (mother)
- Scientific career
- Fields: Computer science, software engineering, entrepreneurship
- Institutions: Swedish Institute of Computer Science; Thingsquare
- Thesis: Programming Memory-Constrained Networked Embedded Systems (2007)
- Website: dunkels.com/adam

Adam Dunkels (born 28 May 1978) is a Swedish computer scientist, software engineer, entrepreneur, and founder of Thingsquare, an Internet of things (IoT) product development business.

His father was professor of mathematics Andrejs Dunkels. His mother was professor Kerstin Vännman. His work is mainly focused on computer networking technology and distributed communication, for small embedded systems and devices and wireless sensor networks on the Internet. He attended the Swedish Institute of Computer Science where he earned Bachelor of Science (B.S.), Master of Science (M.S.) in 2001, and a Doctor of Philosophy (Ph.D.) in 2007. Dunkels is best known to the embedded community as the author of the uIP (micro-IP) and lwIP TCP/IP Internet protocol suite (stacks). He invented protothreads and the operating system Contiki. The MIT Technology Review placed him on the TR35 list of world's top 35 innovators under 35, in 2009.

His book Interconnecting Smart Objects with IP: the Next Internet, co-authored with Jean-Philippe Vasseur, and with a foreword by Vint Cerf, was published in 2010.

He is a founder of the Internet Protocol for Smart Objects Alliance (IPSO Alliance), which promotes IP networking for smart objects such as embedded systems and wireless sensors, and author of the alliance's white paper.

Dunkels received the 2008 Association for Computing Machinery (ACM) SIGOPS EuroSys Roger Needham PhD award for his PhD thesis "Programming Memory-Constrained Networked Embedded Systems". He has won an ERCIM Cor Baayen award.

== Networked embedded software ==
Many of Dunkels's small implementations are used in commercial products from companies, including Asea Brown Boveri (ABB), Altera, BMW, Cisco Systems, Ericsson, GE, Hewlett-Packard (HP), Volvo Technology, and Xilinx. They include:

- Protothreads
- uIP (micro-IP)
- Contiki
- lwIP (lightweight IP)
- uVNC
- Miniweb
- phpstack
- μBASIC
