= Jan Wielemaker =

Dutch computer scientist and professor

Jan Wielemaker (1960, Koudekerke) is a Dutch computer scientist. He initiated the SWI-Prolog implementation of the Prolog programming language in 1987 while employed at the University of Amsterdam, and he continued its development after moving to the Vrije Universiteit Amsterdam. Since 2017, he has been associated with the Centrum Wiskunde & Informatica. In 2020, he became the Director of SWI-Prolog Solutions b.v.

He is known for being the original author and one of the most extensive contributors to the SWI-Prolog, as well as the SWI-Prolog reference manual.
