= Constraint Handling Rules =

Concurrent constraint logic programming language

Constraint Handling Rules (CHR)
- Paradigms: Constraint logic, declarative
- Designed by: Thom Frühwirth
- First appeared: 1991; 34 years ago

Influenced by
- Prolog

Constraint Handling Rules (CHR) is a declarative, rule-based programming language, introduced in 1991 by Thom Frühwirth at the time with European Computer-Industry Research Centre (ECRC) in Munich, Germany. Originally intended for constraint programming, CHR finds applications in grammar induction, type systems, abductive reasoning, multi-agent systems, natural language processing, compilation, scheduling, spatial-temporal reasoning, testing, and verification.

A CHR program, sometimes called a constraint handler, is a set of rules that maintain a constraint store, a multi-set of logical formulas. Execution of rules may add or remove formulas from the store, thus changing the state of the program. The order in which rules "fire" on a given constraint store is non-deterministic, according to its abstract semantics and deterministic (top-down rule application), according to its refined semantics.

Although CHR is Turing complete, it is not commonly used as a programming language in its own right. Rather, it is used to extend a host language with constraints. Prolog is by far the most popular host language and CHR is included in several Prolog implementations, including SICStus and SWI-Prolog, although CHR implementations also exist for Haskell, Java, C, SQL, and JavaScript. In contrast to Prolog, CHR rules are multi-headed and are executed in a committed-choice manner using a forward chaining algorithm.

== Language overview ==
The concrete syntax of CHR programs depends on the host language, and in fact programs embed statements in the host language that are executed to handle some rules. The host language supplies a data structure for representing terms, including logical variables. Terms represent constraints, which can be thought of as "facts" about the program's problem domain. Traditionally, Prolog is used as the host language, so its data structures and variables are used. The rest of this section uses a neutral, mathematical notation that is common in the CHR literature.

A CHR program, then, consists of rules that manipulate a multi-set of these terms, called the constraint store. Rules come in three types:

- Simplification rules have the form $h_1, \dots, h_n \Longleftrightarrow g_1, \dots, g_m \,|\, b_1, \dots, b_o$. When they match the heads $h_1, \dots, h_n$ and the guards $g_1, \dots, g_m$ hold, simplification rules may rewrite the heads into the body $b_1, \dots, b_o$.
- Propagation rules have the form $h_1, \dots, h_n \Longrightarrow g_1, \dots, g_m \,|\, b_1, \dots, b_o$. These rules add the constraints in the body to the store, without removing the heads.
- Simpagation rules combine simplification and propagation. They are written $h_1, \dots, h_\ell \,\backslash\, h_{\ell+1}, \dots, h_n \Longleftrightarrow g_1, \dots, g_m \,|\, b_1, \dots, b_o$. For a simpagation rule to fire, the constraint store must match all the rules in the head and the guards must hold true. The $\ell$ constraints before the $\backslash$ are kept, as a in a propagation rule; the remaining $n - \ell$ constraints are removed.

Since simpagation rules subsume simplification and propagation, all CHR rules follow the format

$$H_k \,\backslash\, H_r \Longleftrightarrow G \,|\, B$$

where each of $H_k, H_r, G, B$ is a conjunction of constraints: $H_k, H_r$ and $B$ contain CHR constraints, while the guards $G$ are built-in. Only one of $H_k, H_r$ needs to be non-empty.

The host language must also define built-in constraints over terms. The guards in rules are built-in constraints, so they effectively execute host language code. The built-in constraint theory must include at least true (the constraint that always holds), fail (the constraint that never holds, and is used to signal failure) and equality of terms, i.e., unification. When the host language does not support these features, they must be implemented along with CHR.

Execution of a CHR program starts with an initial constraint store. The program then proceeds by matching rules against the store and applying them, until either no more rules match (success) or the fail constraint is derived. In the former case, the constraint store can be read off by a host language program to look for facts of interest. Matching is defined as "one-way unification": it binds variables only on one side of the equation. Pattern matching can be easily implemented when as unification when the host language supports it.

=== Example program ===
The following CHR program, in Prolog syntax, contains four rules that implement a solver for a less-or-equal constraint. The rules are labeled for convenience (labels are optional in CHR).

 % X leq Y means variable X is less-or-equal to variable Y 
 reflexivity  @ X leq X <=> true.
 antisymmetry @ X leq Y, Y leq X <=> X = Y.
 transitivity @ X leq Y, Y leq Z ==> X leq Z.
 idempotence  @ X leq Y \ X leq Y <=> true.

The rules can be read in two ways. In the declarative reading, three of the rules specify the axioms of a partial ordering:

- Reflexivity: X ≤ X
- Antisymmetry: if X ≤ Y and Y ≤ X, then X = Y
- Transitivity: if X ≤ Y and Y ≤ Z, then X ≤ Z

All three rules are implicitly universally quantified (upper-cased identifiers are variables in Prolog syntax). The idempotence rule is a tautology from the logical viewpoint, but has a purpose in the second reading of the program.

The second way to read the above is as a computer program for maintaining a constraint store, a collection of facts (constraints) about objects. The constraint store is not part of this program, but must be supplied separately. The rules express the following rules of computation:

- Reflexivity is a simplification rule: it expresses that, if a fact of the form X ≤ X is found in the store, it may be removed.
- Antisymmetry is also a simplification rule, but with two heads. If two facts of the form X ≤ Y and Y ≤ X can be found in the store (with matching X and Y), then they can be replaced with the single fact X = Y. Such an equality constraint is considered built in, and implemented as a unification that is typically handled by the underlying Prolog system.
- Transitivity is a propagation rule. Unlike simplification, it does not remove anything from the constraint store; instead, when facts of the form X ≤ Y and Y ≤ Z (with the same value for Y) are in the store, a third fact X ≤ Z may be added.
- Idempotence, finally, is a simpagation rule, a combined simplification and propagation. When it finds duplicate facts, it removes them from the store. Duplicates may occur because constraint stores are multi-sets of facts.

Given the query

A leq B, B leq C, C leq A

the following transformations may occur:

Current constraints	Rule applicable to constraints	Conclusion from rule application
A leq B, B leq C, C leq A	transitivity	A leq C
A leq B, B leq C, C leq A, A leq C	antisymmetry	A = C
A leq B, B leq A, A = C	antisymmetry	A = B
A = B, A = C	none	

The transitivity rule adds A leq C. Then, by applying the antisymmetry rule, A leq C and C leq A are removed and replaced by A = C. Now the antisymmetry rule becomes applicable on the first two constraints of the original query. Now all CHR constraints are eliminated, so no further rules can be applied, and the answer A = B, A = C is returned: CHR has correctly inferred that all three variables must refer to the same object.

== Execution of CHR programs ==
To decide which rule should "fire" on a given constraint store, a CHR implementation must use some pattern matching algorithm. Candidate algorithms include RETE and TREAT, but most implementation use a lazy algorithm called LEAPS.

The original specification of CHR's semantics was entirely non-deterministic, but the so-called "refined operation semantics" of Duck et al. removed much of the non-determinism so that application writers can rely on the order of execution for performance and correctness of their programs.

Most applications of CHRs require that the rewriting process be confluent; otherwise the results of searching for a satisfying assignment will be nondeterministic and unpredictable. Establishing confluence is usually done by way of the following three properties:

- A CHR program is locally confluent if all its critical pairs are joinable.
- A CHR program is called terminating if there are no infinite computations.
- A terminating CHR program is confluent if all its critical pairs are joinable.

== See also ==
- Constraint programming
- Constraint logic programming
- Logic programming
- Production system (computer science)
- Business rules engines
- Rewriting
