= Logico-linguistic modeling =

Logico-linguistic modeling is a method for building knowledge-based systems with a learning capability using conceptual models from soft systems methodology, modal predicate logic, and logic programming languages such as Prolog.

== Overview ==
Logico-linguistic modeling is a six-stage method developed primarily for building knowledge-based systems (KBS), but it also has application in manual decision support systems and information source analysis. Logico-linguistic models have a superficial similarity to John F. Sowa's conceptual graphs; both use bubble style diagrams, both are concerned with concepts, both can be expressed in logic and both can be used in artificial intelligence. However, logico-linguistic models are very different in both logical form and in their method of construction.

Logico-linguistic modeling was developed in order to solve theoretical problems found in the soft systems method for information system design. The main thrust of the research into has been to show how soft systems methodology (SSM), a method of systems analysis, can be extended into artificial intelligence.

== Background ==
SSM employs three modeling devices i.e. rich pictures, root definitions, and conceptual models of human activity systems. The root definitions and conceptual models are built by stakeholders themselves in an iterative debate organized by a facilitator. The strengths of this method lie, firstly, in its flexibility, the fact that it can address any problem situation, and, secondly, in the fact that the solution belongs to the people in the organization and is not imposed by an outside analyst.

Information requirements analysis (IRA) took the basic SSM method a stage further and showed how the conceptual models could be developed into a detailed information system design. IRA calls for the addition of two modeling devices: "Information Categories", which show the required information inputs and outputs from the activities identified in an expanded conceptual model; and the "Maltese Cross", a matrix which shows the inputs and outputs from the information categories and shows where new information processing procedures are required. A completed Maltese Cross is sufficient for the detailed design of a transaction processing system.

The initial impetus to the development of logico-linguistic modeling was a concern with the theoretical problem of how an information system can have a connection to the physical world. This is a problem in both IRA and more established methods (such as SSADM) because none base their information system design on models of the physical world. IRA designs are based on a notional conceptual model and SSADM is based on models of the movement of documents.

The solution to these problems provided a formula that was not limited to the design of transaction processing systems but could be used for the design of KBS with learning capability.

== The six stages of logico-linguistic modeling ==
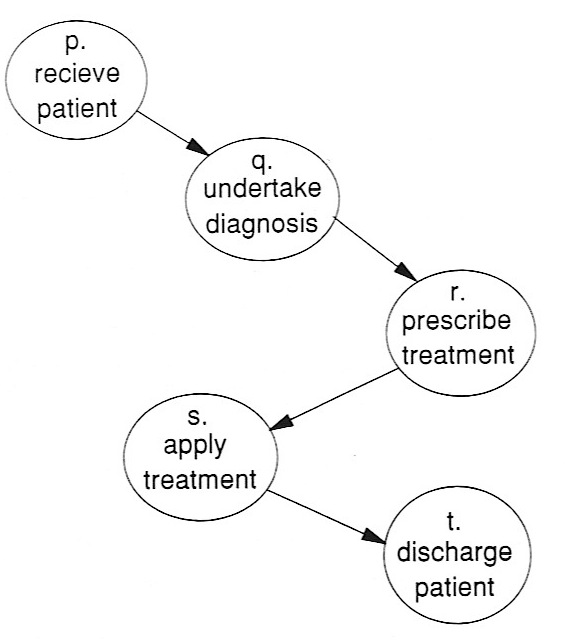
Fig 1. SSM Conceptual Model

The logico-linguistic modeling method comprises six stages.

=== 1. Systems analysis ===
In the first stage logico-linguistic modeling uses SSM for systems analysis. This stage seeks to structure the problem in the client organization by identifying stakeholders, modelling organizational objectives and discussing possible solutions. At this stage it not assumed that a KBS will be a solution and logico-linguistic modeling often produces solutions that do not require a computerized KBS.

Expert systems tend to capture the expertise, of individuals in different organizations, on the same topic. By contrast a KBS, produced by logico-linguistic modeling, seeks to capture the expertise of individuals in the same organization on different topics. The emphasis is on the elicitation of organizational or group knowledge rather than individual experts. In logico-linguistic modeling the stakeholders become the experts.

The end point of this stage is an SSM style conceptual models such as figure 1.

=== 2. Language creation ===
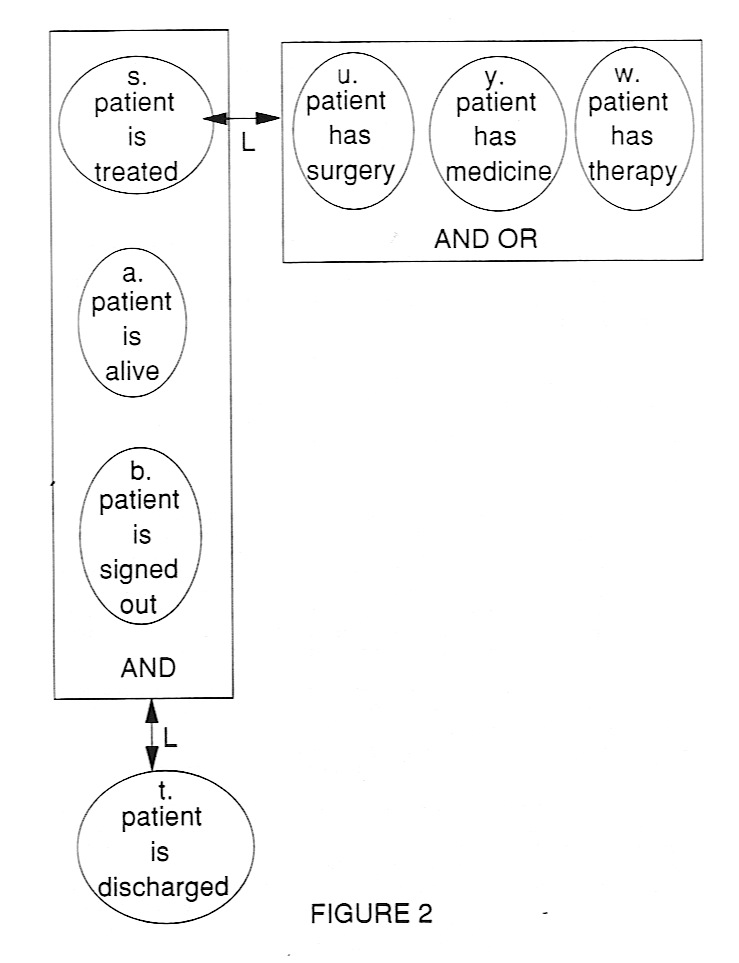
Fig 2. Logico-linguistic Model

According to the theory behind logico-linguistic modeling the SSM conceptual model building process is a Wittgensteinian language-game in which the stakeholders build a language to describe the problem situation. The logico-linguistic model expresses this language as a set of definitions, see figure 2.

=== 3. Knowledge elicitation ===
After the model of the language has been built putative knowledge about the real world can be added by the stakeholders. Traditional SSM conceptual models contain only one logical connective (a necessary condition). In order to represent causal sequences, "sufficient conditions" and "necessary and sufficient conditions" are also required. In logico-linguistic modeling this deficiency is remedied by two addition types of connective. The outcome of stage three is an empirical model, see figure 3.

=== 4. Knowledge representation ===
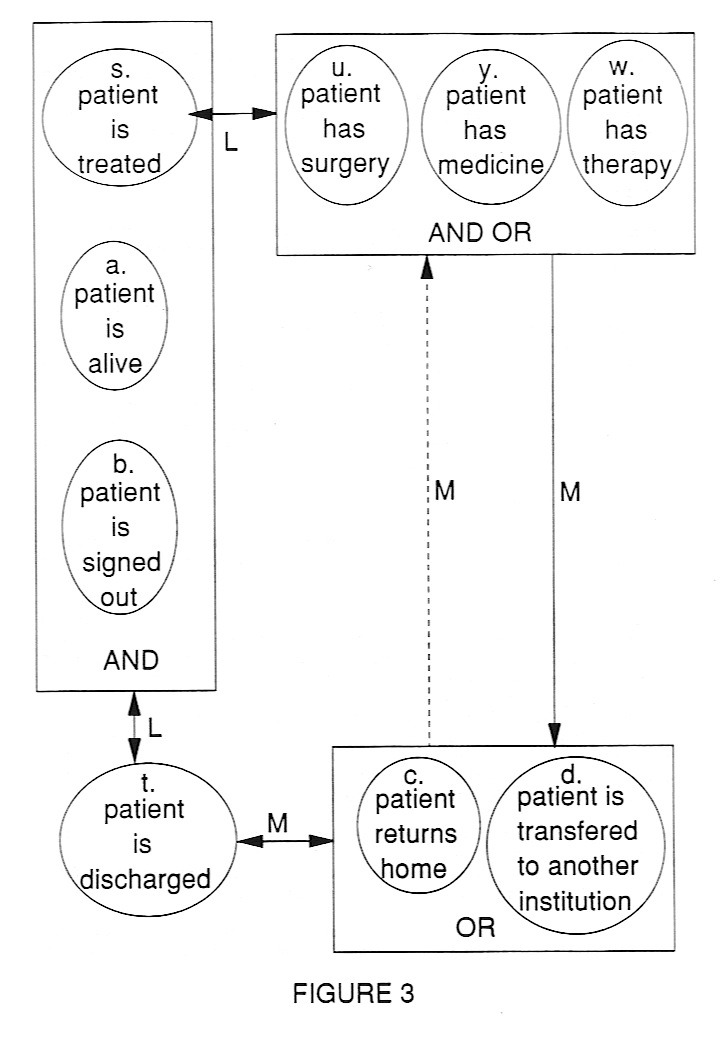
Fig 3. Empirical Model

Modal predicate logic (a combination of modal logic and predicate logic) is used as the formal method of knowledge representation. The connectives from the language model are logically true (indicated by the "L" modal operator) and connective added at the knowledge elicitation stage are possibility true (indicated by the "M" modal operator). Before proceeding to stage 5, the models are expressed in logical formulae.

=== 5. Computer code ===
Formulae in predicate logic translate easily into the Prolog artificial intelligence language. The modality is expressed by two different types of Prolog rules. Rules taken from the language creation stage of model building process are treated as incorrigible. While rules from the knowledge elicitation stage are marked as hypothetical rules. The system is not confined to decision support but has a built in learning capability.

=== 6. Verification ===
A knowledge based system built using this method verifies itself. Verification takes place when the KBS is used by the clients. It is an ongoing process that continues throughout the life of the system. If the stakeholder beliefs about the real world are mistaken this will be brought out by the addition of Prolog facts that conflict with the hypothetical rules. It operates in accordance to the classic principle of falsifiability found in the philosophy of science

== Applications ==
=== Knowledge-based computer systems ===
Logico-linguistic modeling has been used to produce fully operational computerized knowledge based systems, such as one for the management of diabetes patients in a hospital out-patients department.

=== Manual decision support ===
In other projects the need to move into Prolog was considered unnecessary because the printed logico-linguistic models provided an easy-to-use guide to decision making. For example, a system for mortgage loan approval

=== Information source analysis ===
In some cases a KBS could not be built because the organization did not have all the knowledge needed to support all their activities. In these cases logico-linguistic modeling showed shortcomings in the supply of information and where more was needed. For example, a planning department in a telecoms company

== Criticism ==
While logico-linguistic modeling overcomes the problems found in SSM's transition from conceptual model to computer code, it does so at the expense of increased stakeholder constructed model complexity. The benefits of this complexity are questionable and this modeling method may be much harder to use than other methods.

This contention has been exemplified by subsequent research. An attempt by researchers to model buying decisions across twelve companies using logico-linguistic modeling required simplification of the models and removal of the modal elements.

== See also ==
- Argument map
- Cognitive map
- Concept map
- Fuzzy cognitive map
- Knowledge representation and reasoning
- Rhetorical structure theory
- Semantic network
