= Concurrent logic programming =

Logic programming paradigm

Concurrent logic programming is a variant of logic programming designed for parallel computing in which programs are sets of guarded Horn clauses of the form:

H :- G_{1}, …, G_{n} | B_{1}, …, B_{n}.

The conjunction G_{1}, … , G_{n} is called the guard of the clause, and | is the commitment operator.

Declaratively, guarded Horn clauses are read as ordinary logical implications:

H if G_{1} and … and G_{n} and B_{1} and … and B_{n}.

However, procedurally, when there are several clauses whose heads H match a given goal, then all of the clauses are executed in parallel, checking whether their guards G_{1}, … , G_{n} hold. If the guards of more than one clause hold, then a committed choice is made to one of the clauses, and execution proceeds with the subgoals B_{1}, …, B_{n} of the chosen clause. These subgoals can also be executed in parallel. Thus concurrent logic programming implements a form of "don't care nondeterminism", rather than "don't know nondeterminism".

== History ==
The first concurrent logic programming language was the Relational Language of Keith L. Clark and Steve Gregory, which was an offshoot of IC-Prolog. Later versions of concurrent logic programming include Ehud Shapiro's Concurrent Prolog and Ueda's Guarded Horn Clause language.

The development of concurrent logic programming was given an impetus when Guarded Horn Clause was used to implement KL1, the systems programming language of the Japanese Fifth Generation Project (FGCS). The FGCS Project was a $400M initiative by Japan's Ministry of International Trade and Industry, begun in 1982, to use massively parallel computing/processing for artificial intelligence applications. The choice of concurrent logic programming as the “missing link” between the hardware and the applications was influenced by a visit to the FGCS Project in 1982 by Ehud Shapiro, who invented Concurrent Prolog.

== See also ==
- Concurrent constraint logic programming
- Logic programming
- Nondeterministic programming
