= Asimus =

Asimus is a surname. Notable people with this surname include:

- Angie Asimus (born 1985), Australian news presenter and journalist
- Scott Asimus (born 1976), Australian professional rugby league footballer
- Tony Asimus (1896–1968), American politician from Nebraska
