= David H. D. Warren =

British computer scientist

- Education: University of Edinburgh
- Known for: Warren Abstract Machine
- Scientific career
- Workplaces: SRI International; Quintus Computer Systems; University of Bristol
- Thesis: Applied Logic - Its Use and Implementation as Programming Tool (1977)
- Doctoral advisor: Donald Michie; Bernard Meltzer

David H. D. Warren is a computer scientist who worked primarily on logic programming and in particular the programming language Prolog in the 1970s and 1980s. Warren wrote the first compiler for Prolog, and the Warren Abstract Machine execution environment for Prolog is named after him.

== Early life and education ==
Warren received a Ph.D. in artificial intelligence from the University of Edinburgh in 1977, inspired by the ideas of Robert Kowalski and Alain Colmerauer, with formal advisors Donald Michie and Bernard Meltzer.

== Career ==
Warren worked for the Artificial Intelligence Center at SRI International from 1981 to 1983.

He founded the company Quintus Computer Systems in 1983 with William Kornfeld, Lawrence Byrd, Fernando Pereira and Cuthbert Hurd to commercialize the Prolog compiler, Quintus Prolog. Quintus was sold to Intergraph Corporation in 1989.

He was Professor of Computational Logic at the University of Manchester from 1985 to 1988, and Professor of Computer Science at the University of Bristol from 1988 to 1997.
