= Comparison of Prolog implementations =

Timeline of some early Prolog systems, up to the ISO Standard

The following comparison of Prolog implementations provides a reference for the relative feature sets and performance of different implementations of the Prolog computer programming language. A comprehensive discussion of the most significant Prolog systems is presented in an article published in the 50-years of Prolog anniversary issue of the journal Theory and Practice of Logic Programming (TPLP).

== Portability ==
Prolog Heritage. Systems with a dark gray background are not supported any more. Arrows denote influences and inspiration of systems. Quick legend: JIT = "Just in Time Compiler", JVM = "Java Virtual Machine", TOAM = "Tree-Oriented Abstract Machine"

There are Prolog implementations that are radically different, with different syntax and different semantics (e.g. Visual Prolog) and sub-communities have developed around different implementations.

Code that strictly conforms to the ISO-Prolog core language is portable across ISO-compliant implementations. However, the ISO standard for modules is an extension which was not fully adopted in most Prolog systems.

Factors that can adversely affect portability include: use of bounded vs. unbounded integer arithmetic, additional types such as string objects, advanced numeric types (rationals, complex), feature extensions such as Unicode, threads, and tabling. Use of libraries unavailable in other implementations and library organisation:

Currently, the way predicates are spread over the libraries and system built-ins differs enormously. [...] Fortunately, there are only few cases where we find predicates with the same name but different semantics (e.g. delete/3)

== Main features ==
Platform			Features								Toolkit			Prolog Mechanics
Name	OS	Licence	Native Graphics	Compiled Code	Unicode	Object Oriented	Native OS Control	Stand Alone Executable	C Interface (Note: C/Java interface can also be used for graphics and OS control.)	Java Interface	Interactive Interpreter	Debugger	Code Profiler	Syntax
AllegroProlog	Unix, Windows, Mac OS X	Proprietary (limited free edition available)		Yes	Yes	Yes	Yes, via Lisp	Yes	Yes, via Lisp	Yes, via Lisp	Yes	Yes	Yes, via Lisp	S-expressions. Full Common Lisp integration.
BProlog	Unix, Windows, Mac OS X	Proprietary (free for non-commercial uses)		Yes	Yes	Yes	Yes	Yes	Yes	Yes	Yes	Yes	Yes	ISO-Prolog, plus event-handling, CLP(FD), and tabling
Ciao	Unix, Windows, Mac OS X	GPL, LGPL		Yes		Yes	Yes	Yes	Yes	Yes	Yes	Yes	Yes	ISO-Prolog, plus extensions
DOS-Prolog	MS-DOS	Proprietary	Yes	Yes	Yes		Yes	Yes				Yes		Edinburgh Prolog
ECLiPSe	Linux, Windows, Solaris, macOS	MPL		Yes			Yes		Yes	Yes	Yes	Yes	Yes	Extended Prolog, Multi-dialect, including ISO
GNU Prolog	Unix, Windows, Mac OS X	GPL, LGPL		Yes			Yes	Yes	Yes		Yes	Yes		ISO-Prolog
JIProlog	JVM, Android	AGPL (commercial support available)	Yes		Yes		Yes via Java	Yes	Yes via Java	Yes	Yes	Yes		ISO-Prolog
JLog	JVM	GPL	Yes	Yes						Yes	Yes			ISO-Prolog
JScriptLog	Web Browser	GPL									Yes			ISO-Prolog
jTrolog	JVM	LGPL			Yes					Yes	Yes	Yes		ISO-Prolog
WIN-Prolog	Windows	Proprietary	Yes	Yes	Yes	Yes	Yes	Yes	Yes	Yes	Yes	Yes	Yes	Edinburgh Prolog with extensions
Open Prolog	Mac OS System 7	Freeware										Yes		
Poplog Prolog	Linux (32- and 64-bit), Unix, Windows	Free Open Source	Only through POP-11, on Linux	Yes			Yes	Yes	Yes		Yes	Yes		Edinburgh Prolog, with interfaces to Poplog Common Lisp and Pop-11
Scryer Prolog	Linux, Windows, macOS	BSD License			Yes						Yes			ISO-Prolog
SICStus Prolog	Unix, Linux, Windows, macOS	Proprietary	Yes	Yes	Yes	Yes	Yes	Yes	Yes	Yes	Yes	Yes	Yes	ISO-Prolog
Strawberry Prolog	Unix, Windows	Freeware	Yes	Yes	Yes			Yes				Yes		Not ISO-Prolog + extensions
SWI-Prolog	Unix, Linux, Windows, macOS	BSD License	Yes	Yes	Yes		Yes	Yes	Yes	Yes	Yes	Yes	Yes	ISO-Prolog, Edinburgh Prolog
tuProlog	JVM, Android	LGPL	Yes		Yes				Yes	Yes	Yes	Yes		ISO-Prolog
Visual Prolog	Windows	Freeware	Yes	Yes	Yes	Yes	Yes	Yes	Yes			Yes	Yes	
XSB Prolog	Linux, Windows, Solaris, macOS	LGPL		Yes	Yes		Yes	Yes	Yes	Yes	Yes	Yes	Yes	ISO-Prolog, tabled WFS
YAP-Prolog	Linux, Windows, Solaris, Mac OS X, HP-UX	GPL or Artistic (user choice)		Yes	Yes		Yes	Yes	Yes	Yes	Yes	Yes		ISO-Prolog, Edinburgh Prolog, Quintus and SICStus Prolog compatible

== Operating system and web-related features ==
	OS-related				Web-related			
Name	Conditional compilation	Sockets	Multi-threading	Tabling	HTTP client	HTTP server	HTML Parser	RDF Triple store
BProlog				Yes				
Ciao	Yes	Yes	Yes	Yes	Yes	Yes	Yes	
ECLiPSe	Yes	Yes	Yes		Yes		Yes	
GNU Prolog		Yes						
WIN-Prolog		Yes			Yes	Yes	Yes	
Scryer Prolog		Yes		Yes	Yes	Yes	Yes	
SICStus Prolog	Yes	Yes	Yes					
SWI-Prolog	Yes	Yes	Yes	Yes	Yes	Yes	Yes	Yes
Visual Prolog	Yes	Yes	Yes		Yes	Yes	Yes	
XSB	Yes	Yes	Yes	Yes	Yes			
YAP-Prolog	Yes	Yes	Yes	Yes				

== Static analysis ==
Name	Type checker	Determinacy checker	Call-pattern checker
Ciao	Yes	Yes	Yes
GNU Prolog			
SICStus Prolog		Yes	
SWI-Prolog		Yes	
Visual Prolog	Yes	Yes	Yes
XSB			
YAP-Prolog			

== Optimizations ==
Name	Tail-Call Optimization	Choice Point Elimination	Environment Trimming	Just-in-Time Indexing
Ciao	Yes	Yes	Yes	?
ECLiPSe	Yes	Yes	Yes	multi-argument (compile time)
GNU Prolog	Yes	Yes	Yes	
SICStus Prolog	Yes	Yes	Yes	
SWI-Prolog	Yes	Yes	Yes	Yes
Visual Prolog	Yes (compile time)	Yes (compile time)	N/A	N/A (compile time)
XSB	Yes	Yes	Yes	?
YAP-Prolog	Yes	Yes	Yes	Yes

== Release ==
Name	Version	Date
AllegroProlog	1.1.2	2018-12-12
BProlog	8.1	2014-02-23
JIProlog	4.1.7.1	2021-08-26
Ciao	1.25	2025-06-21
DOS-Prolog	8.0	
ECLiPSe	7.1	2023-01-01
GNU Prolog	1.5.0	2023-02-21
JLog	1.3.6	2007-09-13
JScriptLog	0.7.5 beta	2007-09-10
jTrolog		
WIN-Prolog	8.0	2022-07-14
Open Prolog		
Poplog Prolog	V16	2020-01-06
Scryer Prolog	0.10.0	2025-09-27
SICStus Prolog	4.9.0	2023-12-18
Strawberry Prolog	6.1	2023-08-23
SWI-Prolog	9.3.28	2025-08-08
tuProlog	2P-Kt 1.0.4	2024-05-26
Visual Prolog	10, Build 1000	2021-04-15
XSB Prolog	5.0	2022-05-15
YAProlog	7.1.0	2020-12-19

== Benchmarks ==
- Benchmarking issues: Odd Prolog benchmarking, Performance differences.
- Benchmarking software: older, Dobry's Benchmarks, Aquarius benchmark suite, (Bothe, 1990), (Demoen et al. 2001), benchmark descriptions
- Benchmarking results: B-Prolog, SICStus, XSB, SICStus vs Yap vs hProlog
- Benchmarking results: Survey of java prolog engines by Michael Zeising
- Benchmarking results: OpenRuleBench yearly open-source benchmark of rule engines
