= María García de la Banda =

Spanish computer scientist

María José García de la Banda García is a Spanish computer scientist who works at Monash University in Australia as a professor of information technology. Her research involves constraint logic programming, programming language design and implementation, program transformation, and applications to bioinformatics.

== Early life and education ==
García de la Banda is the daughter of a scientist, and began studying computer science because at the time it was the only engineering discipline with a high proportion of female students. She earned an engineering informatics degree from the Technical University of Madrid in 1992, and completed a Ph.D. there in 1994. Her dissertation, Parallelism in Dynamically Scheduled Constraint Logic Programming, was supervised by Manuel de Hermenegildo Salinas; it won the best dissertation award of the university.

== Career ==
After postdoctoral research at the University of Melbourne, she joined Monash University as a Logan Fellow, a position she held there from 1997 to 2003. At Monash, she has served as head of the Caulfield School of Information Technology, deputy dean of faculty, and deputy dean of research.

She was president of the Association for Constraint Programming for 2020.
