= Pascal Van Hentenryck =

Belgian computer scientist

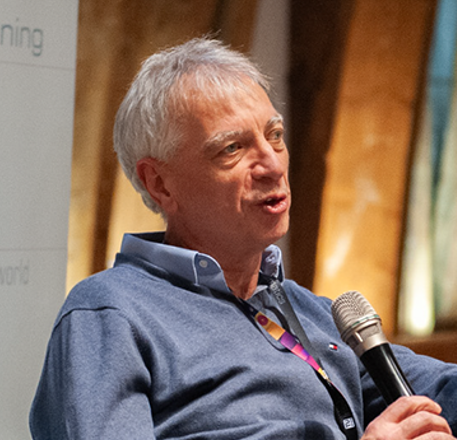
- Pascal Van Hentenryck delivers a keynote at TU Wien Informatics in Vienna.
- Born: 8 March 1963 (age 63)
- Education: Université de Namur (PhD)
- Known for: Constraint programming, Optimization
- Scientific career
- Fields: Computer science
- Workplaces: Brown University (1990–2012); NICTA (2012-2015); University of Michigan (2015-2018); Georgia Institute of Technology
- Thesis: Constraint Satisfaction in Logic Programming (1989)
- Doctoral advisor: Baudouin Le Charlier
- Website: https://sites.gatech.edu/pascal-van-hentenryck/

Pascal Van Hentenryck (born 8 March 1963) is a Belgian-American computer scientist and the A. Russell Chandler III Chair and Professor of Industrial and Systems Engineering at Georgia Tech. He is credited with pioneering advances in constraint programming, artificial intelligence, and stochastic optimization, bridging theory and practice to solve real-world problems across a range of domains including energy systems, supply chains, sports scheduling, protein folding, disaster relief, power systems, recommender systems, and transportation. He has developed several optimization technologies including CHIP, Numerica, the Optimization Programming Language (OPL—now an IBM product), and Comet. He has also published several books, including Constraint Satisfaction in Logic Programming, Numerica, the Optimization Programming Language (OPL), Online Stochastic Combinatorial Optimization, Hybrid Optimization, and Constraint-Based Local Search.

Van Hentenryck is an AAAI and INFORMS fellow and has received numerous awards and honorary degrees for his contributions to optimization and artificial intelligence.

== Career ==
Pascal Van Hentenryck was born in Belgium and obtained his PhD in Computer Science from the University of Namur in 1987. He joined Brown University’s Department of Computer Science in 1990 after spending four years at the European Computer-Industry Research Center where he led development of the CHIP system. In 1993, he was awarded an NSF National Young Investigator Award. Van Hentenryck spent the next several years at Brown developing new optimization technologies to address open problems in vehicle routing, disaster relief, and power systems management.

In 2009, Van Hentenryck co-founded Dynadec, a spin-off company based on optimization technologies he developed at Brown. In 2012, Van Hentenryck left Brown to lead the 70-person Optimization Research Group at NICTA in Australia until its merger with CSIRO in 2015.

Van Hentenryck joined the University of Michigan in 2015. At Michigan, his work spanned several areas, including power systems, transportation, and computational social science. In 2017, Van Hentenryck ran the Seth Bonder Data Science Summer Camp for High School Students. In 2018, he launched RITMO, a new transportation system for the University of Michigan’s campus that achieved a three minute average wait time.

In 2018, Van Hentenryck left Michigan to join the Georgia Institute of Technology as the A. Russell Chandler III Chair and Professor of Industrial and Systems Engineering. As of 2021, Van Hentenryck serves as the director of the NSF Artificial Intelligence Institute for Advances in Optimization (AI4OPT). AI4OPT was renewed in July 2026.

Van Hentenryck's mobility research continued with an on-demand public transportation pilot with MARTA called MARTA Reach and another pilot with Chatham Area Transit called CAT SMART in 2024. In 2025, he co-founded Modal, an on-demand transportation software spin-off company from his research at the University of Michigan and the Georgia Institute of Technology.

Van Hentenryck has also taught a Massive Open Online Course on discrete optimization.

== Honors and awards ==
In 2002, Van Hentenryck received the INFORMS ICS Award for research excellence in optimizations research and computer science, and in 2004, he was awarded an IBM Faculty Award. In 2006, Van Hentenryck received the ACP award for research excellence in Constraint Programming. In 2008, he was awarded an honorary doctorate from the University of Louvain, and in 2011, an honorary degree from the University of Nantes. He has received several best paper awards including at CP ‘03, CP ‘04, IJCAI ‘07, SEDE ‘09, AAAI ‘15, and CP ‘16. He has also received awards for outstanding contributions to teaching and education, including the Philip J. Bray Award for Teaching Excellence in 2010 at Brown, and the 2013 IFORS Distinguished Lecturer Award. He was elected to the 2016 class of Fellows of the Institute for Operations Research and the Management Sciences.
