= CHIP (programming language) =

Constraint logic programming language

CHIP (Constraint Handling in Prolog) is a constraint logic programming language developed by M. Dincbas, Pascal Van Hentenryck and colleagues in 1985 at the European Computer-Industry Research Centre (ECRC), initially using a Prolog language interface. It was the first programming language to implement constraint programming over finite domains, and subsequently to introduce the concept of global constraints. CHIP was instrumental in showing the benefits of constraint programming for optimization applications, in particular scheduling, routing, and packing applications. Constraint programming has become one of the technologies of choice for these applications, supported by both commercial and open-source solvers. It provides an alternative to mathematical programming solvers.

CHIP V5 is the version developed and marketed by COSYTEC in Paris since 1993, using C, C++, or Prolog language interfaces. The commercially successful ILOG CPLEX solver includes the CP Optimizer solver (originally named Ilog Solver) which is also, partly, an offshoot of the ECRC version of CHIP.
