= Mathematical program =

The term mathematical program can refer to:

- A computer algebra system which is a computer program that manipulates mathematical entities symbolically
- Computer programs that manipulate numerical entities numerically, which are the subject of numerical analysis
- A problem formulation of an optimization problem in terms of an objective function and constraint (mathematics) (in this sense, a mathematical program is a specialized and now possibly misleading term that predates the invention of computer programming)
