= ILOG =

Software company that makes products including JRules

ILOG S.A.
- Type: Public
- Industry: Enterprise software
- Founded: 1987; 39 years ago, Paris, France
- Defunct: January 2009
- Fate: Acquired by IBM
- Successor: IBM ILOG

ILOG S.A. was an international software company purchased and incorporated into IBM, announced in January 2009. It created enterprise software products for supply chain, business rule management, visualization, and optimization. The main product line for Business Rules Management Systems (BRMS) has been rebranded as IBM Operational Decision Management. Many of the related components retain the ILOG brand as a part of their name.

The software developed by the ILOG software company supports several software platforms, including COBOL, C++, C#, .NET, Java, AJAX and Adobe Flex, and Flex AIR.

Founded in 1987 in Paris, France, ILOG had its main headquarters in Gentilly, France, and Sunnyvale, California. It also had main offices in Australia, China, Germany, Japan, Singapore, and the United Kingdom.

Through its acquisition of CPLEX Optimization Inc. in 1997, ILOG became the owner of the CPLEX mathematical programming software, and ILOG's acquisition of LogicTools in 2007 made ILOG the owner of a line of supply chain applications. The CPLEX and other tools also had some minor rebranding under the IBM Optimization Suite of tools.

== Products ==
ILOG's main products:

- ILOG JRules and ILOG Rules, business rule management systems (BRMS) that enable both business and IT users to write and maintain the logic applied by applications that automatically implement decisions. J signifies Java, while the other was in C++.
- ILOG Views and ILOG JViews, a visualization development system and toolkit based on C++ (the former) and Java (the latter) with add-ons for charts, maps, and reactive graphic objects. This product still exists as Rogue Wave Software Views.
- ILOG CPLEX, optimization software for mathematical programming
- IBM ILOG Elixir component sets for Adobe AIR and Adobe Flex platforms
- IBM ILOG Supply Chain Apps
- ILOG Solver was considered the market leader in commercial constraint programming software as of 2006.
- Based on ILOG Solver, there were other specialized component libraries, like ILOG Scheduler for modeling/solving scheduling problems, ILOG Dispatcher for dispatching (delivery, pick-up) problems, as well as ILOG Configurator for configuration problems.

== Company ==
ILOG was an international software company. It developed, marketed, sold, and supported BRMS, optimization, and visualization software components, as well as supply chain applications. ILOG had business locations in nine countries, but it had two principal locations incorporated into IBM:

- France: Gentilly, a small town just outside Paris
- United States: Sunnyvale, California, south of San Francisco

== History ==
The name ILOG is an abbreviation of the combination of two French words: "Intelligence" and "Logiciel". These words can be translated as "Intelligent Software."

In 1987, ILOG began licensing software components to companies developing software applications. These customers licensed the components to add new functionality to their software applications. The software components were initially developed in the LISP programming language and transitioned to C++ in 1992 to follow the technical evolution of the software industry.

ILOG introduced two new products in 1993: ILOG Views and ILOG Solver. ILOG customers use them to make visualization interfaces (Views) and resource allocation applications (Solver). Until 1995, ILOG's sales were concentrated in Europe, particularly in France. In 1995, the company started to expand globally by establishing a major sales presence in the United States and Asia.

Although ILOG had its linear programming solver called ILOG Planner, in 1997 Apr 19, it acquired CPLEX Optimization, Inc. (CPLEX), located in Incline Village, Nevada, which provided linear-based optimization software libraries. In the late 1990s, ILOG started to introduce Java versions of its products to follow once again the software industry’s technical evolution. It also introduced a business rule management system (BRMS) product in 1996, which gives software engineers the ability to better manage the rules operating their applications. The financial services sector has been the primary market for ILOG's BRMS products, for use in developing, for example, online trading or credit decision-making applications. ILOG's BRMS product line is currently the company's largest product line.

ILOG also introduced a C# version of some of its visualization products in fiscal year 2004 and of its BRMS products in fiscal year 2005.

Until ILOG's initial public offering in 1997 on the NASDAQ National Market (which subsequently became the Nasdaq Stock Market on August 1, 2006), ILOG was financed through a combination of retained earnings, venture capital funding, and interest-free loans from French government agencies and the European Union. This initial public offering enabled ILOG to acquire CPLEX.

In 1998, SAP AG invested in ILOG. The financing from SAP was part of the partnership that has made SAP ILOG's biggest customer every year for a while. This partnership, along with others, made ILOG a player in the supply chain management market. In 1998, ILOG was listed on the Nouveau marché of Euronext Paris and in 2005 transferred to Eurolist by Euronext Paris.

== Recent developments ==
On October 26, 2006, ILOG acquired 35% of the capital and voting rights of the Chinese company Shanghai FirstTech Co., Ltd. (FirstTech). FirstTech is a systems integrator that develops and markets manufacturing and insurance solutions in the Chinese market.

On November 20, 2006, ILOG acquired one-third of the capital and voting rights of Prima Solutions (Prima), a Paris-based supplier of software platforms for the insurance sector.

On April 11, 2007, ILOG completed the acquisition of LogicTools, a Chicago-based provider of supply chain planning applications specializing in network design and inventory optimization. LogicTools’ applications are based on the ILOG CPLEX optimization product.

On July 28, 2008, IBM and ILOG announced an agreement regarding a proposed acquisition by IBM of ILOG.

On January 6, 2009, the acquisition of ILOG by IBM was completed.

On July 1, 2009, the "Transfer of Business" letter was issued, which confirmed that ILOG was effectively integrated within IBM. This coincided with a fresh release of the ILOG products, which is now branded as an IBM ILOG company.

== Customers ==
As of 2026, no less than 142 companies used ILOG. These include companies such as Huawei, UPS, JPMorgan Chase, and Wells Fargo.
