= Constraint algebra =

Linear space of all constraints on a Hilbert space

In theoretical physics, a constraint algebra is a linear space of all constraints and all of their polynomial functions or functionals whose action on the physical vectors of the Hilbert space should be equal to zero.

For example, in electromagnetism, the equation for the Gauss' law

$$\nabla\cdot \vec E = \rho$$

is an equation of motion that does not include any time derivatives. This is why it is counted as a constraint, not a dynamical equation of motion. In quantum electrodynamics, one first constructs a Hilbert space in which Gauss' law does not hold automatically. The true Hilbert space of physical states is constructed as a subspace of the original Hilbert space of vectors that satisfy

$$(\nabla\cdot \vec E(x) - \rho(x)) |\psi\rangle = 0.$$

In more general theories, the constraint algebra may be a noncommutative algebra.

== See also ==
- First class constraints
