= SMF 120.9 =

Record of IBM System Management Facility

The SMF 120 Subtype 9 is a new SMF record made available IBM's WebSphere Application Server for z/OS Version 7. Its design is based on customer feedback regarding the data required when operating WAS z/OS. The previous WAS z/OS SMF records were Subtypes 1, 3, 5, 6, 7 and 8. Those subtypes continue to exist, but Subtype 9 may be viewed as a replacement.

The shorthand way of referring to SMF 120 Subtype 9 is SMF 120.9.

The SMF 120.9 was provided to address two shortcomings in the previous SMF design for WAS z/OS:

- Information spread across multiple subtype records, which made it difficult to get a clear picture of activity by request
- Higher than desired overhead to enable the older SMF records

The SMF 120.9 activity record is based on a per request design. There is no longer any need to correlate data points across records to determine statistical information per request. The information contained in an SMF 120.9 record contains the data for each request.

The overhead of turning on SMF 120.9 has been measured at approximately 1.5% of system CPU for the basic activity records.

== SMF 120.9 Sections ==
The SMF 120.9 record is divided into ten sections, each section having a number of fields containing the specific information about the request. Some of the sections are optional; they may be turned on or off based on the administrator's need for that information.

- Platform neutral server information
- z/OS server information
- Platform neutral request information
- z/OS request information
- z/OS formatted timestamps (optional section)
- Network data for HTTP, SIP, and IIOP transports
- Classification data
- Security data (optional section)
- CPU usage breakdown (optional section)
- User data (optional section) -- use the package com.IBM.websphere.smf API to add up to 5 user data sections to the end of the record, each section not more than 2K bytes in length.

The IBM Information Center link referenced below has a mapping of each sections data fields with a description of what the data represents.

The WP101342 Techdoc referenced below has an extensive description of the feature and was written by the architect and developer of the new function.

== Related Items ==
=== MODIFY Support ===
The z/OS operating system allows started tasks to be modified by an operator command. That allows the behavior of the started task to be dynamically altered. The degree of modification permitted is a function of the started task program and the limits of the environment.

The format of the modify command is:

/F <JOBNAME>,parameters

For WAS z/OS the modify is issued against the controller JOBNAME. The SMF 120.9 function of WAS z/OS supports the modify command with the following parameters:

- SMF,REQUEST,ON | OFF
- SMF,REQUEST,CPU,ON | OFF
- SMF,REQUEST,SECURITY,ON | OFF
- SMF,REQUEST,TIMESTAMPS,ON | OFF

=== Sample Java SMF 120.9 Record Browser ===
A sample Java program is available that will evaluate the dumped SMF 120.9 records and provide by a detailed and a summary view of the information they contain. It may be obtained at this link. Registration is required.

The sample SMF browser as it is called is not intended to be a replacement for more powerful SMF record analysis products. It is useful for seeing the format of records and verifying that records are being written, and for smaller scale analysis.
