= Donald F. Ferguson =

- Born: 1960 (age 65–66)
- Education: Columbia University (BA, MS, PhD)
- Occupations: Professor, businessman
- Employer: Columbia University
- Known for: CTO for software of Dell
- Title: Professor of Professional Practice in Computer Science

Donald Francis Ferguson (born 1960) is a Technical Fellow and Chief SW Architect at Ansys, Inc. Before joining Ansys, Ferguson was a Professor of Professional Practice in Computer Science at Columbia University. Before joining Columbia in 2018, he was vice president and CTO for software at Dell. Previously he was CTO, Distinguished Engineer and Executive VP at CA, Inc., formerly known as Computer Associates.

== Education ==
Ferguson graduated with a BA from Columbia University in 1982, a MS in 1984, and a PhD in computer science in 1989. His thesis studied the application of economic models to the management of system resources in distributed systems.

== Career ==
=== IBM ===
From 1985 to 2007, Ferguson worked for IBM, being appointed IBM Fellow in 2001, and chief architect for IBM's Software Group (SWG). He provided overall technical leadership for IBM WebSphere, Tivoli Software, IBM DB2, Rational Software and Lotus Software products. He also chaired the SWG Architecture Board (SWG AB). The SWG AB focused on product integration, cross-product initiatives and emerging technology. Some of the public focus areas were web services, patterns, web 2.0 and business-driven development. Ferguson guided IBM's strategy and architecture for SOA and web services, and co-authored many of the initial web-service specifications.

Previously, he had been the chief architect for WebSphere and the WebSphere products, which provide support for dynamic web applications. Prior to transferring to IBM SWG, Ferguson was a research staff member at the IBM Thomas J. Watson Research Center.

=== Microsoft ===
From 2007 to 2008, he worked at Microsoft as a technical fellow in platforms and strategy in the office of the CTO.

=== CA ===
Ferguson joined CA in March 2008.

=== Dell ===
Ferguson joined Dell in June 2012 as VP and CTO for Dell Software.

=== Awards ===
Ferguson received the 2013 Columbia School of Engineering and applied Science Alumni Association Egleston Medal for Distinguished Engineering Achievement.

=== Ansys ===
Ferguson focuses on product integration, additional of new capabilities and strategic initiatives.

== Books ==
- Web Services Platform Architecture: SOAP, WSDL, WS-Policy, WS-Addressing, WS-BPEL, WS-Reliable Messaging, and More, Prentice Hall PTR, ISBN 0-13-148874-0, March 22, 2005
