= BNR Prolog =

Constraint logic programming language

BNR Prolog, also known as CLP(BNR), is a declarative constraint logic programming language based on relational interval arithmetic developed at Bell-Northern Research in the 1980s and 1990s. Embedding relational interval arithmetic in a logic programming language differs from other constraint logic programming (CLP) systems like CLP(R) or Prolog-III in that it does not perform any symbolic processing. BNR Prolog was the first such implementation of interval arithmetic in a logic programming language. Since the constraint propagation is performed on real interval values, it is possible to express and partially solve non-linear equations.

== Example rule ==
The simultaneous equations:

$$\begin{align}
\tan x &= y \\
x^2 + y^2 &= 5
\end{align}$$

are expressed in CLP(BNR) as:

?- {X>=0,Y>=0, tan(X)==Y, X**2 + Y**2 == 5}.

and a typical implementation's response would be:

X = _58::real(1.0966681287054703,1.0966681287054718),
Y = _106::real(1.9486710896099515,1.9486710896099542).
Yes

== See also ==
- Comparison of Prolog implementations
- Prolog syntax and semantics

== General references ==
- J. G. Cleary, "Logical Arithmetic", Future Computing Systems, Vol 2, No 2, pp. 125–149, 1987.
- W. Older and A. Vellino, "Extending Prolog with Constraint Arithmetic on Real Intervals", in Proc. of the Canadian Conf. on Electrical and Computer Engineering, 1990.
- Older, W., and Benhamou, F., Programming in CLP(BNR), in: 1st Workshop on Principles and Practice of Constraint Programming, 1993.
