= Regular constraint =

In artificial intelligence and operations research, a regular constraint is a kind of global constraint. It can be used to solve a particular type of puzzle called a nonogram or logigrams.
