= IBM WebSphere =

Brand of computer software

IBM Websphere
- IBM WebSphere logo

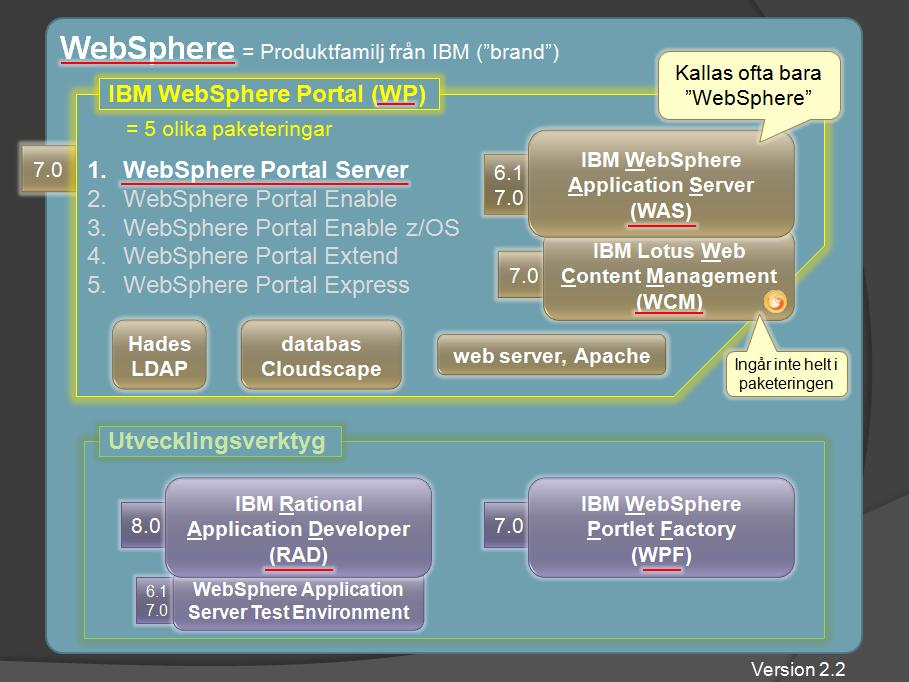
- Website: www.ibm.com/cloud/websphere-application-platform/

IBM WebSphere refers to a brand of proprietary computer software products in the genre of enterprise software known as "application and integration middleware". These software products are used by end-users to create and integrate applications with other applications. IBM WebSphere has been available to the general market since 1998.

== History ==
In June 1998, IBM introduced the first product in this brand, IBM WebSphere Performance Pack. As of 2012 this first component formed a part of IBM WebSphere Application Server Network Deployment.

== Products ==
The following products have been produced by IBM within the WebSphere brand:

- IBM WebSphere Application Server - a web application server
- IBM Workload Deployer - a hardware appliance that provides access to IBM middleware virtual images and patterns
- IBM WebSphere eXtreme Scale - an in-memory data grid for use in high-performance computing
- IBM HTTP Server
- IBM WebSphere Adapters
- IBM Websphere Business Events
- IBM Websphere Edge Components
- IBM Websphere Host On-Demand (HOD)
- IBM WebSphere Message Broker
- Banking Transformation Toolkit
- IBM MQ
- IBM WebSphere Portlet Factory
- IBM WebSphere Process Server
- WebSphere Commerce (sold to HCL Technologies in 2019)
- WebSphere Portal (sold to HCL Technologies in 2019)
- WebSphere Studio Application Developer (aka WSAD, replaced Rational Application Developer in 2003)
