= Department of Computing, Imperial College London =

Academic department in London, England

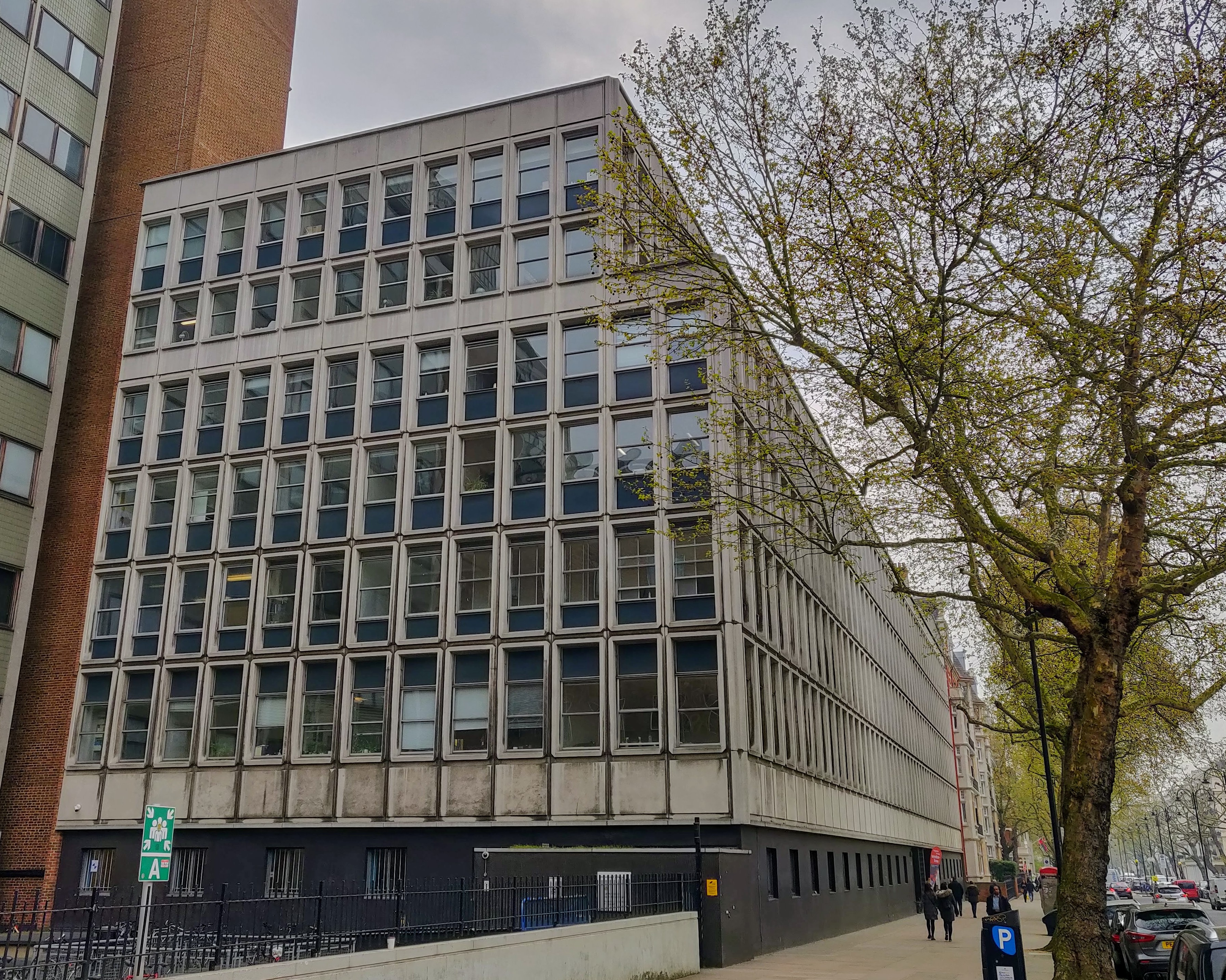
- Huxley Building
- Former name: Department of Computing and Control
- Established: 1964
- Head of Department: Professor Stefanos Zafeiriou
- Faculty: Imperial College Faculty of Engineering
- Staff: 54
- Students: 1064
- Location: Queen's Gate, London, United Kingdom; 51.498750°N 0.179250°W
- Campus: South Kensington
- Website: www.imperial.ac.uk/computing

Map
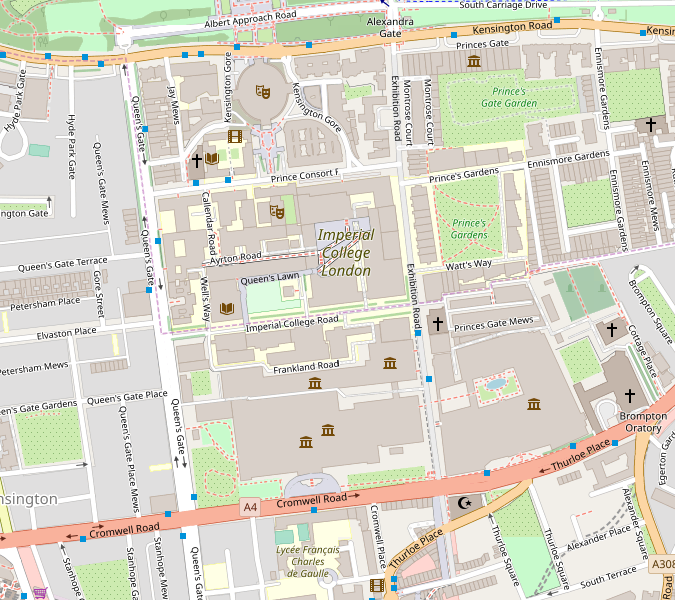
- Location within Albertopolis, South Kensington

The Department of Computing is an academic department of the Faculty of Engineering at Imperial College London in England, United Kingdom.

The department has around 50 academic staff and 1000 students, with around 600 studying undergraduate courses, 200 PhD students, and 200 MSc students. The department is predominantly based in the Huxley Building, 180 Queen's Gate, which it shares with the Maths department, however also has space in the William Penney Laboratory and in the Aeronautics and Chemical Engineering Extension. The department ranks 9th in the Times Higher Education 2026 subject world rankings.

== History ==
The origins of the department start with the formation of the Computer Unit in 1964, led by Stanley Gill, out of the Department of Electrical Engineering. However, earlier work had also been done by the Department of Mathematics, which had built the Imperial College Computing Engine, an early digital relay computer. In 1966, the postgraduate Centre for Computing and Automation came into being and consumed the pre-existing Computer Unit, with John Westcott migrating his Control Group from the Electrical Engineering department and joining Stanley Gill as joint head. In 1970, Gill left for industry, the department was renamed to The Department of Computing and Control, and Westcott became the head.

In 1972, Manny Lehman joined the department and with Westcott, developed the first undergraduate course (BSc). Before Lehman joined, there was some progress towards the design of an undergraduate course; however, Lehman found this to be too mathematical and also Westcott didn't wish to compete with the hardware focus of Manchester University. Therefore, it was decided to focus the course on the creation of software and related methodologies. The first intake for the course was in 1973, and the first graduates in 1976. On the research front, the department held a logic programming workshop, which "evolved into the ICLP" (International Conference on Logic Programming).

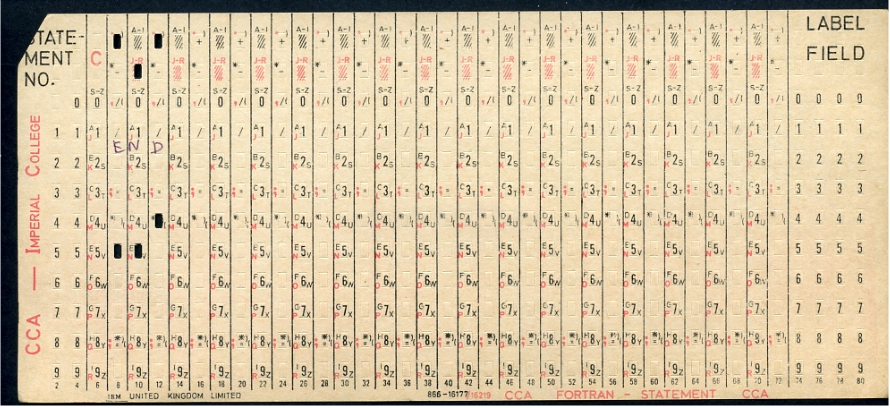
Fortran punch card as used by the department

The department moved to the Huxley Building in 1977. In 1979 Westcott's term as head of department came to an end and the position was up for renewal, it was given to Lehman. During Westcott's term, the control engineers had been doing most of the research in the department, and the computer scientists doing most of the teaching; in order to establish Computing as its own subject, then Rector Lord Flowers advised Lehman to send Westcott and his control group back to Electrical Engineering, and the department assumed its current name, the Department of Computing. Lehman started designing a Software Engineering course, his belief was that software engineering is practical by nature and as part of the course wanted students to have industrial experience. However, professional software engineering was not as it is today and Lehman founded IST to provide a place for Imperial students to get some practical experience.

Throughout the 80s, the department was recognised as a "leading centre for logic programming", and by 1985 the size of the logic programming group had grown to 50. In 1980, Keith Clark co-founded Logic Programming Associates, which aimed to apply the results of the logic programming group's research to industrial problems.

When Lehman's term came up for renewal in 1984, he was not reappointed and instead went to work full time for IST. Bruce Sayers, the then head of Electrical Engineering was appointed as head of the department. Over the course of his term, Sayers "doubled the size of the department", but this increase caused office spaces to become over-occupied, and required more teaching space. To remedy this the Holland Club moved out of the Huxley Building and lecture theatres 308 and 311 were constructed in their place, furthermore, the William Penney Laboratory was constructed in 1988. Sayers later became the head of the Centre for Cognitive Systems, which resided in the newly built William Penney Laboratory. In 1993, IC-PARC was founded, also residing in the William Penney Laboratory. It span out in 1999 to create Parc Technologies and the centre was later shut down in 2005.

== Academics ==
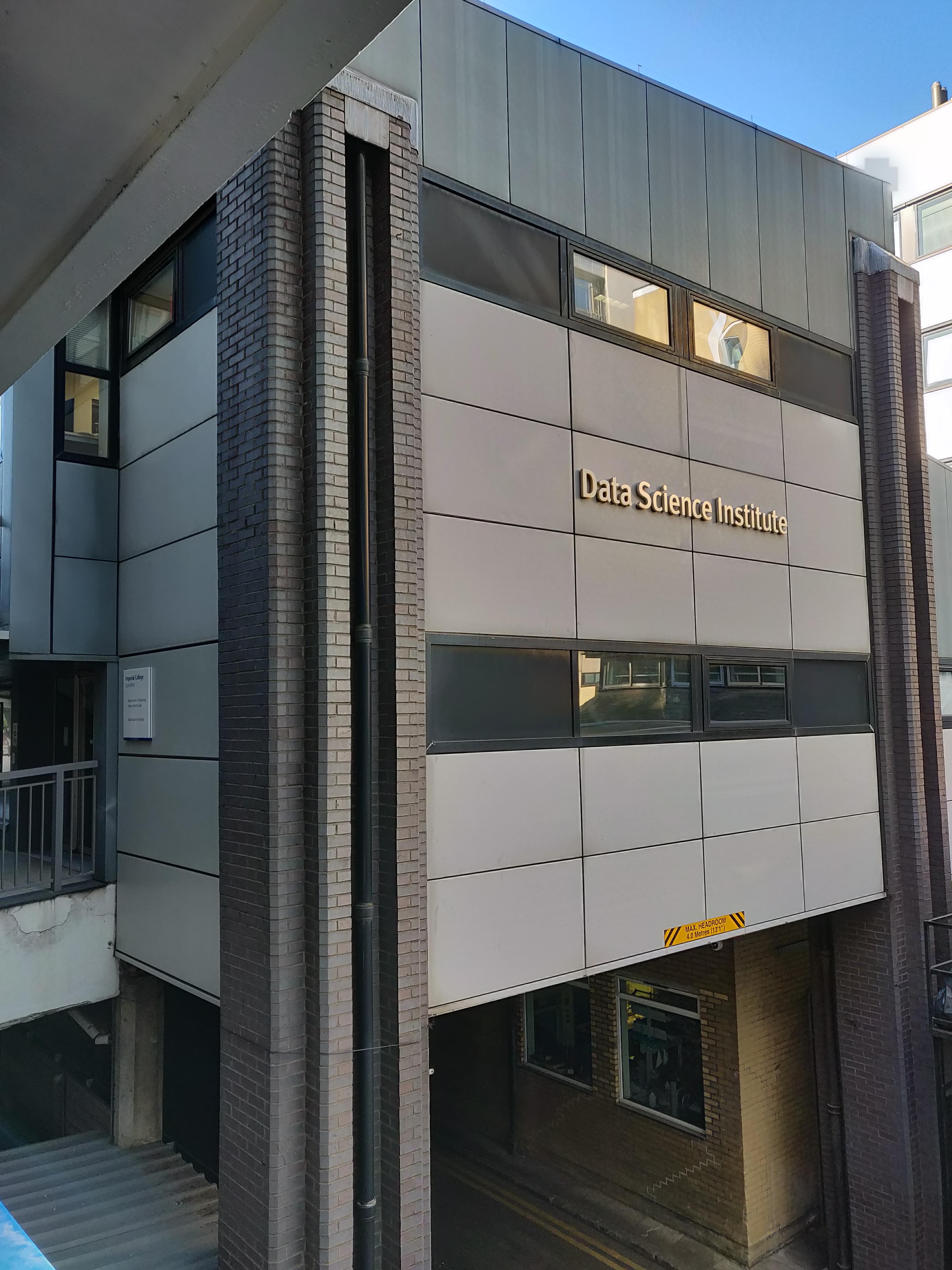
Some of the department is located in the William Penny Laboratory

=== Study ===
==== Undergraduate ====
The department offers both courses in Computing and joint courses in Maths and Computing. Students can apply for either the three year BEng or four year MEng course, however, the first two years are common and so students are able to switch between these courses up until the start of the third year (provided they meet academic requirements). Master's students can choose to specialize in a particular field, or also study management and finance as part of their degree. The department also has ties to universities in Europe and further abroad, including UC Berkeley and MIT, allowing students on the master's course to study abroad for one year of their program. All students who obtain an undergraduate degree from the department are also awarded the Associateship of the City & Guilds Institute, ACGI.

==== Postgraduate ====
The department offers MSc taught masters programs in either Computer Science, designed for graduates of other subjects, and Advanced Computing, designed for graduates of bachelor's courses. The department also offers specialist master's degrees which focus on particular fields of study within computer science. The department also offers an MRes course as part of the EPSRC, and takes on PhD students. All students graduating with any of the postgraduate degrees (MSc, MRes or PhD) are also awarded the Diploma of Imperial College, DIC.

=== Reputation ===
The department ranks seventh in the world in the Times Higher Education 2020 subject rankings, ranking third in the UK, as well as twelfth in the QS World University Rankings. Domestically, the department ranks third on the Complete University Guide's 2020 computer science table, and fourth in The Guardian's 2020 computer science university subject rankings. The department also produces graduates with the highest average pay of any course six months after graduation, and the highest in the subject five years out, earning an average of £60,000, ahead of second place Oxford by £4,200.

== Student life ==
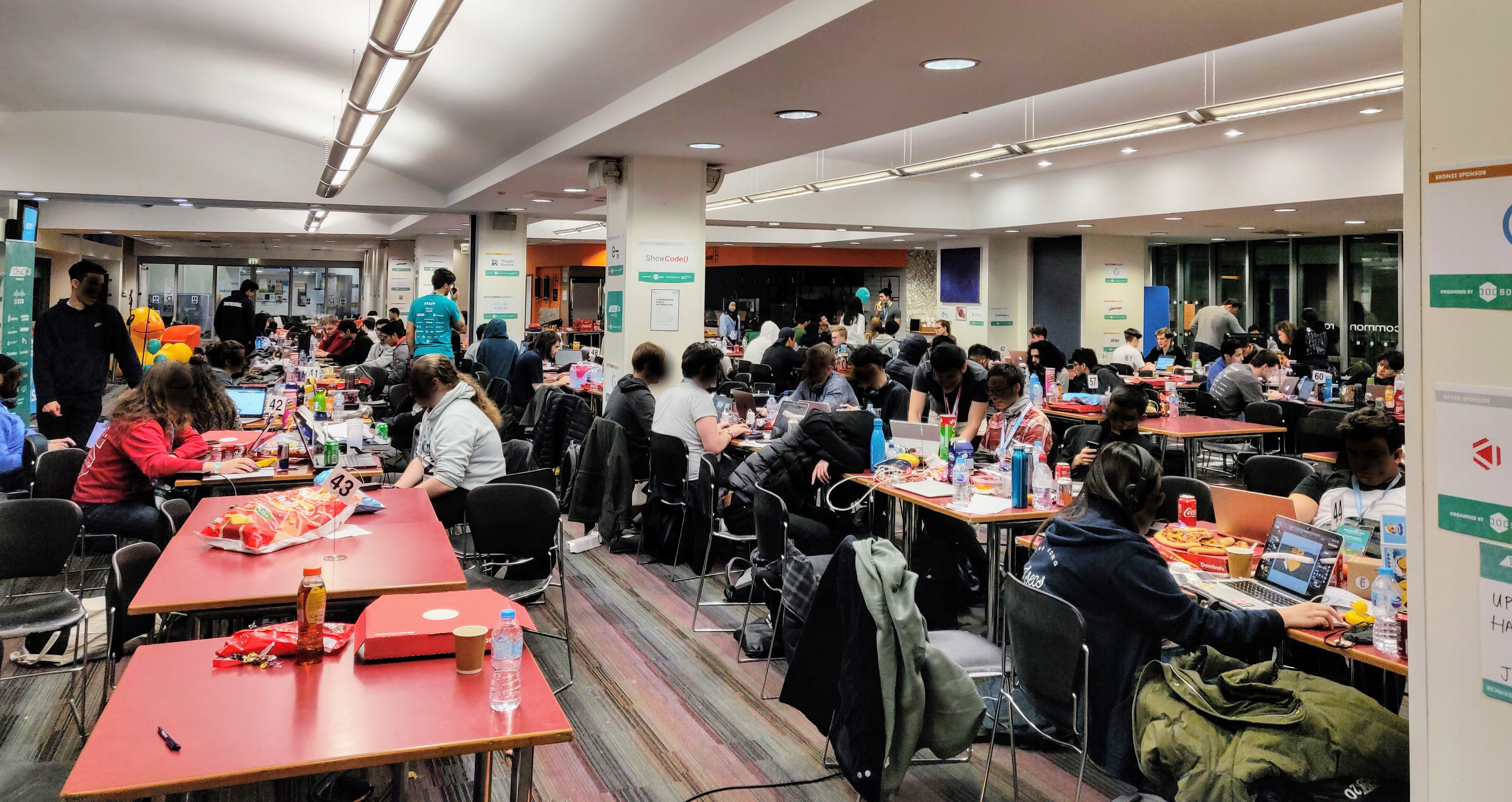
Contestants during IC Hack 20

Student activities are organised by DoCSoc, the departmental society for computing students. DoCSoc is organised by a team of student volunteers, and is funded by corporate sponsors, organised as part of the City and Guilds College Union, a constituent union of Imperial College Union. It runs events social and educational events throughout the year, including ICHack, an annual hackathon open to university students from both the college and elsewhere, with over 300 participants in 2018.

DoCSoc was refounded in 1986, and ran a magazine What's up DoC? by 1995. By 1997, student magazine was called Data, however, today the society no longer runs a magazine.

== People ==
=== Heads of Department ===
- 1964–66, Stanley Gill (also British Computer Society President between 1967–68; Founding member of Real Time Club)
- 1966–70, Stanley Gill (computing) and John Westcott (automation)
- 1966–79, John Westcott
- 1979–84, Manny Lehman (also known for Lehman's laws of software evolution)
- 1984–89, Bruce Sayers
- 1989–97, Tom Maibaum
- 1997–99, Robert Kowalski
- 1999–2004, Jeff Kramer (also Director of Studies 1990–95)
- 2004–2010, Jeff Magee
- 2010–2016, Susan Eisenbach
- 2016–2020, Daniel Rueckert (also co-founder of IXICO)
- 2020–2024, Michael Huth
- 2024–2025, Alessandra Russo
- 2025–present, Stefanos Zafeiriou

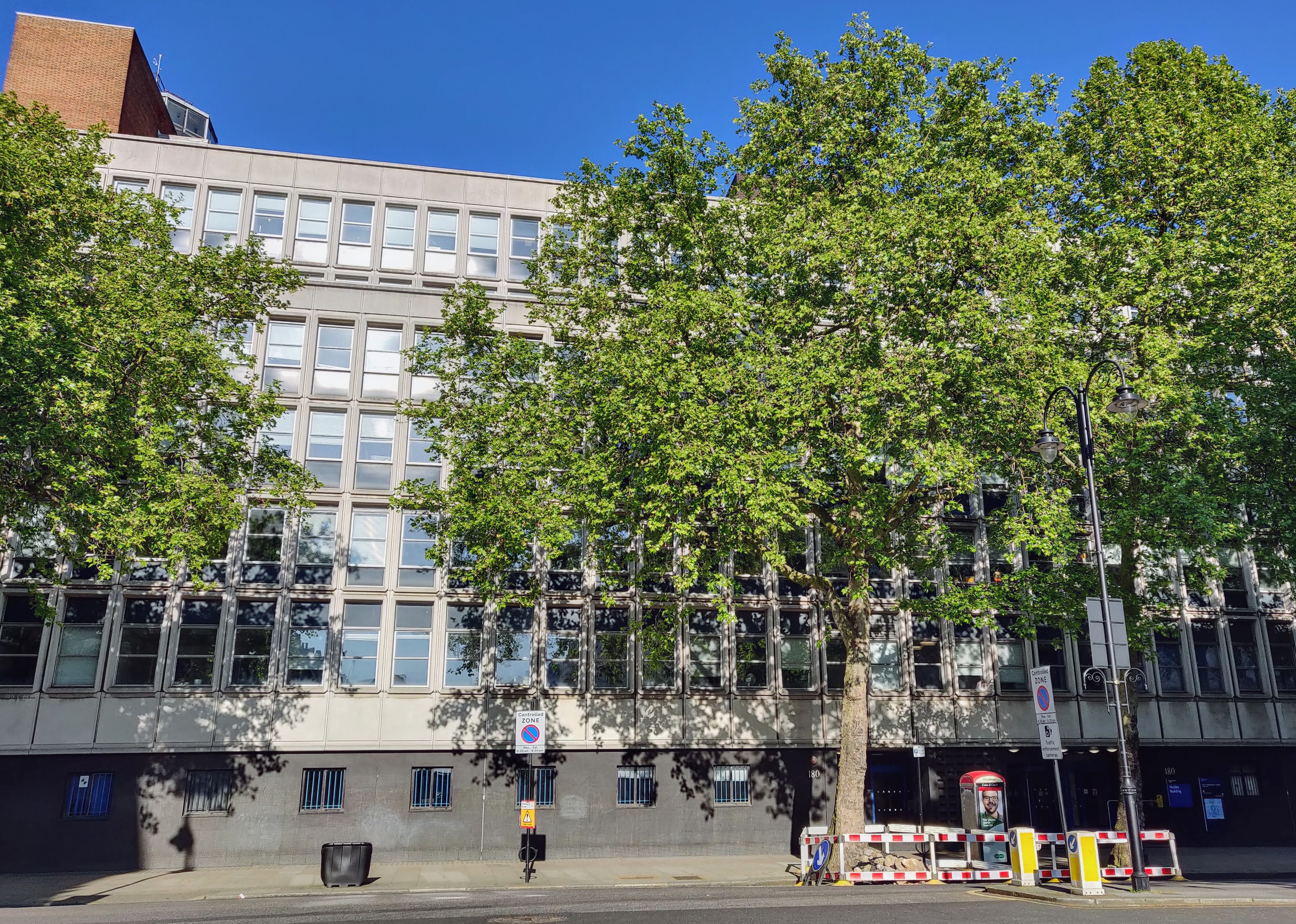
Huxley Building from across Queen's Gate

=== Faculty ===
- Abbas Edalat (Professor since 1997)
- Alastair Donaldson (Professor of Programming Languages)
- Aldo Faisal (Professor of AI & Neuroscience)
- Alessandra Russo (Professor of Applied Computational Logic)
- Alessio Lomuscio (Professor of Safe Artificial Intelligence)
- Anthony Finkelstein (Visiting Professor)
- Bjoern Schuller (Professor of Machine Learning)
- Cristian Cadar (Professor of Software Reliability)
- Keith Clark (Professor, founder of Logic Programming Associates)
- Lluis Vilanova (Associate Professor)
- Maja Pantić (Professor)
- Marek Sergot (co-creator of Event calculus)
- Murray Shanahan (Professor of AI)
- Nick Jennings (Professor of AI)
- Nicolas Wu (Professor of Computer Science, leads the Functional Programming Research Group)
- Nobuko Yoshida (Professor)
- Peter Cornwell (Visiting Professor and former director of Visual Computing Group)
- Peter G. Harrison (Professor since 1972)
- Peter McBrien (Associate Professor in Computing Science)
- Peter Pietzuch (Professor of Large-Scale Data and Systems)
- Philippa Gardner (Professor of Theoretical Computer Science since 2009)
- Ruth Misener
- Sophia Drossopoulou (Professor, known for her paper on the soundness of Java)
- Steffen van Bakel (Associate professor)
- Stephen Muggleton (Professor)
- Francesca Toni (Professor in Computational Logic and head of the Computational Logic and Argumentation Group)

==== Former ====
- Alexander L. Wolf (Professor 2006–2016)
- Igor Aleksander (Deputy Head of Department)
- Samson Abramsky (Lecturer 1983–88, Reader 1988–90, Professor 1990–93)
- László Bélády (Spent 1974 in the department)
- Dov Gabbay (Professor 1983-98)
- George Coulouris (Lecturer 1965–75)

== Alumni ==
- Bashar Ahmad Nuseibeh (MSc 1989, PhD 1994)
- Chris Harrison (Winner of University Challenge in 1996)
- Danny Lui (Founder of Lenovo)
- Diomidis Spinellis (4x winner of the International Obfuscated C Code Contest)
- Edwige Pitel (Professional cyclist)
- Gavin Estcourt (Winner of University Challenge in 2001)
- Guido Jouret (PhD 1991, ABB Chief Digital Officer)
- Ian Foster (Winner of Lovelace Medal and Gordon Bell Prize)
- Jeff Magee (PhD 1984, Former Head of Department)
- John Shawe-Taylor (MSc 1987?)
- Leslie Valiant (Winner of Turing award, 2010)
- Mark Harman (MEng 1988)
- Mark Morris (co-Founder of Introversion Software)
- Peter Lipka (COO of Improbable)
- Richard Veryard (MSc 1977)
- Robert Cromwell (co-Founder of Inkling)
- Siegfried Hodgson (Winner of University Challenge in 2001)
- Teo Chee Hean (MSc 1977, Deputy PM of Singapore)
- Zehan Wang (CTO of Magic Pony Technologies, acquired by Twitter for $150m)

== Spinoff Companies ==
- Logic Programming Associates (Cofounded by Keith Clark in 1980)
- Imperial Software Technologies (Created by Manny Lehman in 1983)
- Parc Technologies (acquired by Cisco for $9 million in 2004)
- GraphicsFuzz (Acquired by Google in 2018)
- FaceSoft (raised £500k in funding in 2018)
