= Candlin =

Candlin is a surname. Notable people with the surname include:

- David John Candlin (1928–2019), English physicist
- Mitchel Candlin (born 2000), English footballer
- Rosemary Candlin (1927–2025), British crystallographer and computer scientist, wife of David John
