= Sidney Michaelson =

Scottish computer scientist

Sidney Michaelson (5 December 1925 – 21 February 1991) was Scotland's first professor of Computer Science. He was joint founder of the Institute of Mathematics and its Applications. As an author he is remembered for his analysis of the Bible.

== Life ==
He was born on 5 December 1925 in the East End of London into a relatively poor family. He attended Raine's Foundation School. Academically brilliant he won a scholarship to Imperial College, London. He studied mathematics and graduated in 1946. Subsequently he was co-designer of the Imperial College Computing Engine with Tony Brooker and Ken Tocher. He began lecturing at Imperial College in 1949. In 1963 he moved to the University of Edinburgh as Director of its newly founded Computer Unit, and in 1969 became the first Professor of Computer Science.

Notable students included Rosemary Candlin.

In 1969 he was elected a Fellow of the Royal Society of Edinburgh. His proposers were Nicholas Kemmer, David Finney, Sir Michael Swann and Arthur Erdelyi.

He died in Edinburgh on 21 February 1991.

== Family ==
His wife Kitty died in 1995. They had four children.

One of his sons, Greg, is Professor Emeritus, School of Mathematical & Computer Sciences at Heriot Watt University, Edinburgh

== Recognition ==
In 1991 the University of Edinburgh created the Sidney Michaelson Prize in Computer Science in his honour.

Michaelson Square in Livingston is named in his memory.

== Publications ==
- K. D. Tocher and S. Michaelson, The Imperial College Computing Engine, in R. V. Bowden (ed), Faster Than Thought, Sir Isaac Pitman & Sons, Ltd, 1953, pp161-164.
- R. E. D. Bishop, G. M. L. Gladwell and S. Michaelson, The Matrix Analysis of Vibration, Cambridge University Press, 1965.
- S. Michaelson and A. Q. Morton, Positional Stylometry, in A. J. Aitken, R. W. Bailey and N. Hamilton-Smith, The Computer and Literary Studies, Edinburgh University Press, 1973, pp69-83.
- S. Michaelson, A. Q. Morton and N. Hamilton-Smith. To Couple is the Custom, CSR-22-78, Internal Report, Department of Computer Science, University of Edinburgh, Revised November 1978.
- S. Michaelson, A. Q. Morton and N. Hamilton-Smith, Justice for Helander, CSR-42-79, Internal Report, Department of Computer Science, University of Edinburgh, July 1979.
- A Critical Concordance of I and II Corinthians (1979)
- A Critical Concordance of the Letter of Paul to the Romans (1977)
- A. Q. Morton and S. Michaelson, The Qsum Plot, CSR-3-90, Internal Report, Department of Computer Science, University of Edinburgh, April 1990.
