= Imperial College Computing Engine =

Post-war digital computers

ICCE I and ICCE II were digital computers built at the Imperial College Department of Mathematics in the post-war period.

== Computing engines ==
=== ICCE I ===
The first Imperial College Computing Engine, ICCE I, was constructed by Sidney Michaelson, Tony Brooker and Keith Tocher in the Department of Mathematics at Imperial College London in the late 1940s and early 1950s. It was a relay based machine which gave relatively slow but highly reliable service. Its current whereabouts are unknown.

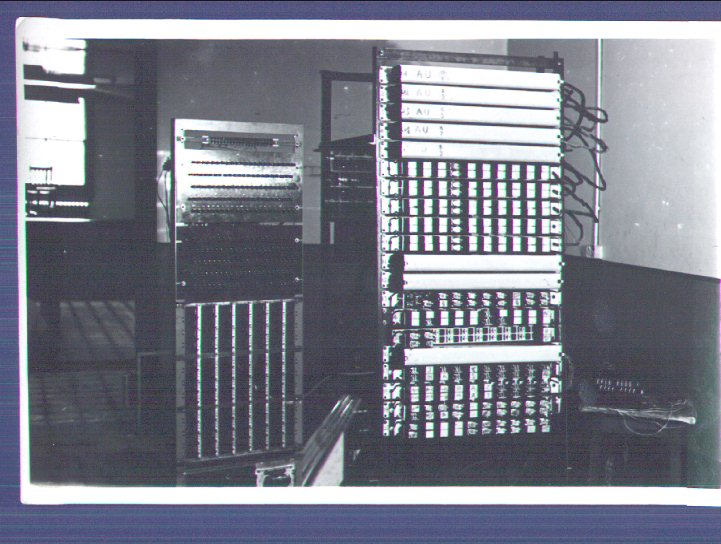
ICCE1 Arithmetic Unit

=== ICCE II ===
ICCE II was constructed by Sidney Michaelson, Keith Tocher and Manny Lehman in the early 1950s. This valve based machine was never completed. ICCE II was taken by Keith Tocher to British Steel. Its current whereabouts are unknown.

==== Influence on other machines ====
ICCE I and II influenced the design of SABRAC, the computer constructed in Israel by The Israeli MoD Scientific Department.

==== Project termination ====
In 1956/7, the project was forcibly terminated. Staff dispersed. In 1951 Tony Brooker had left to join the Computing Machine Laboratory at the University of Manchester. Keith Tocher took ICCE II and went to work at British Steel, Sidney Michaelson went to the University of Edinburgh and founded the Computer Unit which subsequently became the Department of Computer Science, now the school of informatics. Manny Lehman ultimately joined the Israeli MoD Scientific Department which subsequently became Rafael.

== See also ==
- Wilks MV and Stringer LJB, Micro-Programming and the Design of the Control Circuits in an Electronic Computer, Proc. Camb. Phil. Soc., vol 49, no. 2, 1953
- Tocher KD, Classification and Design of Operation Codes for Automatic Computers, Proc. IEE, 103B, Supplement 1, Apr. 1956
- Tocher KD and Lehman MM, A Fast Parallel Arithmetic Unit, Proc. IEE 103B, Supplement 3, Apr. 1956, pp. 520–527
- Lehman MM, Parallel Arithmetic Units and Their Control, PhD Thesis, University of London, Feb. 1957, 160pps.+
- Lehman MM, Short-Cut Multiplication and Division in Automatic Binary Digital Computers with Special Reference to a New Multiplication Process, Proc. IEE, vol 105, Part B, No 23, Sept 1958, pps. 496–504
- Tocher KD, Techniques of Multiplication and Division for Automatic Binary Computers, Quart. J. of Mechanics and Appl. Maths., v. 11, p. 3, 1958, pps. 364–384
- http://www.macs.hw.ac.uk/~greg/icce/
