= LPA =

LPA may refer to:

== Groups, organizations, companies ==
- Argentine Patriotic League (Liga Patriótica Argentina)
- Lao People's Army
- Liberal Party of Australia
- Libertarian Party of Alabama, USA
- Lincoln Park Academy, a school in Florida
- Live Performance Australia, which organises the Helpmann Awards
- Little People of America, supports people with dwarfism
- Local planning authority, UK
- Logic Programming Associates, a software company
- London Psychogeographical Association

== Biochemistry ==
- L-Phenylalanine
- Lipoprotein(a) or Lp(a), a human gene
- Lysophosphatidic acid, involved in cell proliferation and Rho signalling

== Transportation ==
- Gran Canaria International Airport, Spain, IATA code
- A US Navy hull classification symbol: Amphibious transport (LPA)

== Other ==
- Law of Property Act 1925, an English land law statute
- Lasting power of attorney in English law
- Low-pressure area
