= Tony Brooker =

British computer scientist (1925–2019)

- Born: Ralph Anthony Brooker; 22 September 1925; Fulham, London, England
- Died: 20 November 2019 (aged 94); Hexham, England
- Education: Imperial College London
- Known for: Mark 1 Autocode; The compiler-compiler
- Scientific career
- Fields: Computer science
- Workplaces: University of Cambridge; Manchester University; Essex University

Ralph Anthony Brooker (22 September 1925 – 20 November 2019), was a British computer scientist known for developing the Mark 1 Autocode.

He was educated at Emanuel School and graduated in Mathematics from Imperial College in 1945 and returned there in 1947 as assistant lecturer. His first computer project was the construction of a fast multiplier unit from electro-mechanical relays. This was taken over by Sid Michaelson and K. D. Tocher and incorporated into ICCE, the Imperial College Computing Engine based on the same technology. By then (1949)Brooker had moved to the University of Cambridge Computer Laboratory to work for Maurice Wilkes on software development for EDSAC.

In October 1951 Brooker joined the Computing Machine Laboratory at Manchester University, where he took over from Alan Turing the task of writing programming manuals and running a user service on the Ferranti Mark 1 computer. It was his experience with the rather tedious Manchester machine-coding conventions that led him to devise what was probably the world's first publicly available High-Level Language. This was the Mark 1 Autocode available from March 1954 and therefore about two years ahead of the first Fortran compiler.

Throughout the 1950s Brooker led a group at Manchester working on the theoretical underpinnings of compilers. This culminated in the compiler-compiler, a seminal idea first presented at a British Computer Society Conference in July 1960 by Brooker and Derrick Morris. This was subsequently implemented on the Ferranti ATLAS and used for high-level language development. The ATLAS was regarded as the world's most powerful computer when it was brought into service in December 1962.

In the mid-1960s Brooker helped to inaugurate the UK's first Computer Science degree course at Manchester. He moved to Essex University in 1967 to take up the university's founding Chair of Computer Science. The first Essex Computer Science graduates obtained their degrees in the summer of 1970. He retired in 1988 and died on 20 November 2019 in Hexham.
