= Manny Lehman =

Manny Lehman may refer to:

- Manny Lehman (DJ), house music DJ and producer
- Manny Lehman (computer scientist) (1925–2010), professor of computer science
