= Peter Cornwell =

Peter Cornwell may refer to:

- Peter Cornwell (computer scientist) (born 1958), British computer scientist and media theorist
- Peter Cornwell (director), film director from Australia
