= Pamela Zave =

American computer scientist

- Born: 1948 (age 77–78)
- Education: Cornell University (BA, 1970); University of Wisconsin–Madison (PhD, 1976)
- Awards: ACM Fellow (2001); Harlan D. Mills Award (2017)
- Scientific career
- Fields: Computer science
- Workplaces: Princeton University
- Doctoral advisor: Donald R. Fitzwater

Pamela Zave (born 1948) is an American computer scientist who works at Princeton University. She is known for her work on networking, protocol modeling and verification, telecommunications services, and requirements engineering. She was named a Fellow of the Association for Computing Machinery in 2001 and was the 2017 recipient of the Harlan D. Mills Award from the IEEE Computer Society. Zave is the author, with Jennifer Rexford, of The Real Internet Architecture: Past, Present, and Future Evolution, published in 2024 by Princeton University Press.

== Education and career ==
Zave graduated from Cornell University in 1970 with a bachelor's degree in English. She earned her doctorate in computer science from the University of Wisconsin–Madison in 1976 under the name Pamela Zave Smith; her thesis, "Functional equivalence of parallel processes", was supervised by Donald R. Fitzwater. She taught at the University of Maryland, College Park from 1975 to 1981 and then joined Bell Labs (which was then part of AT&T). She remained in the AT&T part of the Labs through the two corporate splits that formed Bellcore in 1984 and Lucent in 1996 and continued working at AT&T Labs Research through 2017. Since then she has been a research associate at Princeton University.

== Awards and honors ==
In 2017 Zave received the Harlan D. Mills Award from the IEEE Computer Society "for groundbreaking use of formal methods in the development of telecommunication software and for enduring contributions to software engineering theory."

In 2001 Zave was named a Fellow of the Association for Computing Machinery "for encouraging the use of formal methods in the development of telecommunication software through influential research, tool development, large case studies, and professional education." She was also selected as an AT&T Fellow in 2009, and an IFIP Fellow in 2022.

Zave has been awarded 34 patents in the telecommunications area.

== Research on networking ==
The Real Internet Architecture: Past, Present, and Future Evolution introduces Compositional Network Architecture, which is a formal model of the architecture of network ecosystems such as the Internet. In the book, the model is used to describe the original Internet, today's Internet, and several trends influencing Internet evolution.

== Research on protocol modeling and verification ==
Zave's work on finding bugs in the Chord protocol and proving a modified version correct has been credited by engineers in Amazon Web Services for convincing them to start using formal methods on real distributed systems.

== Research on telecommunication services ==
Distributed Feature Composition (DFC) is a modular architecture for telecommunication services, designed to provide structured feature composition and easy management of feature interactions. DFC was invented by Zave and Michael Jackson beginning in 1997.

An implementation of DFC was used to build the features for CallVantage (SM), AT&T's first voice-over-IP service, which became publicly available in 2004 and served approximately 100,000 customers world-wide. After CallVantage the DFC implementation was used to build a teleconferencing system used internally by AT&T, which for some time supported millions of user minutes each work day. DFC has also been incorporated into the Java Community Process standard for SIP Servlet containers.

Zave holds 34 patents in the telecommunications area. Her papers on telecommunications research have won three Best Paper Awards: IEEE Software best paper of 1989 for "A compositional approach to multiparadigm programming", 7th International Workshop on Feature Interactions in Telecommunications and Software Systems (2003), and 3rd International Conference on Principles, Systems and Applications of IP Telecommunications (2009).

== Research on requirements engineering ==
In collaboration with Michael A. Jackson, Zave created the set of definitions and reasoning obligations that have become known as the standard model for requirements engineering. The model is most fully explained in the paper "Four dark corners of requirements engineering." Earlier papers on this work won the Ten-Year Most Influential Paper Award from three conferences: 11th International Requirements Engineering Symposium (2003), 27th International Conference on Software Engineering (2005), and 18th IEEE Conference on Requirements Engineering (2010).

== Personal ==
In 2014 Zave married her partner, the Cuban-American artist Yolanda V. Fundora. She is a quilter.

== See also ==
- SailFin
