= Alessandra Russo =

British professor

- Education: University of Bari
- Known for: Computational Logic, Symbolic Machine Learning
- Scientific career
- Workplaces: Imperial College London
- Thesis: Modal Labelled Deductive Systems (1996)
- Doctoral advisor: Dov Gabbay and Krysia Broda

Alessandra Russo is a professor in Applied Computational Logic at the Department of Computing, Imperial College London.

== Career ==
She obtained a Laurea in Computer Science from the University of Bari in 1990, achieving a grade of 110/110 (cum laude) before completing her PhD at Imperial College London in 1996. From 1997 to 2001, she worked at Imperial as a Research Associate before being appointed a lecturer in 2001. She was appointed Head of the Department of Computing, Imperial College London in 2024.

She leads the Structured and Probabilistic Intelligent Knowledge Engineering (SPIKE) research group, which focuses on developing frameworks and algorithms for structured and probabilistic knowledge.

== Awards ==
She was awarded the prize for the best application paper at the International Conference on Logic Programming (ICLP) in 2002 and the Imperial College Rector's Award for Excellence in Teaching in 2011. She is also a fellow of the British Computer Society.

== Projects ==
- ILASP (Learning from Answer Sets) is a system which enables learning interpretable knowledge from labelled data using Inductive Logic Programming.
