= Boundless (company) =

American textbook company

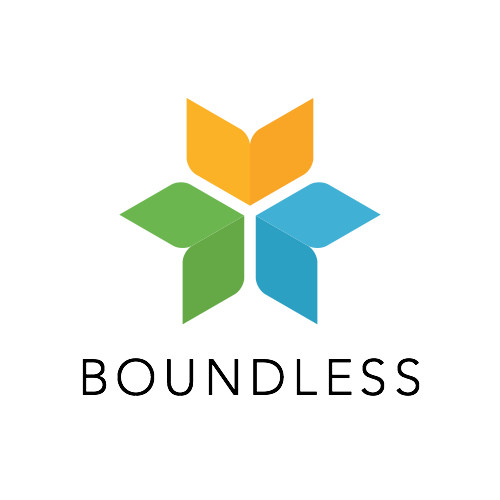
- Industry: Education
- Founded: March 2011; 15 years ago
- Fate: Acquired by Valore in April 2015
- Headquarters: Boston, Massachusetts, U.S.
- Key people: Geoffrey Willison (CEO)
- Products: Textbooks (as E-books)
- Website: Archived version from 2017

Boundless was an American company, founded in 2011, which created free and low-cost textbooks and distributed them online. In April 2015, it was acquired by Valore. The combined company is based in Boston, Massachusetts.

In May 2017, it was announced that Boundless course materials would not be available after September 2017. Lumen Learning archived the Boundless collection on the Lumen platform.

== History ==
Boundless was founded in March 2011 by Ariel Diaz, Aaron White, and Brian Balfour. The company raised $1.7 million in funding during 2011.

In March 2012, the company was sued by three publishers: Pearson Education, Cengage Learning, and Bedford, Freeman & Worth Publishing Group (owned by Macmillan Publishers). Among other allegations, the lawsuit claims that "Boundless textbooks copy the distinctive selection, arrangement, and presentation of Plaintiffs’ textbooks, along with other original text, imagery, and protected expression of Plaintiffs and their authors, all in violation of the Copyright Act." On December 17, 2013, the company announced that the lawsuit had been settled. Terms of the settlement are confidential.

Boundless raised an additional $8 million in venture capital funding in April 2012. In January 2013, the company claimed that students at over 2000 colleges in the United States were using its textbooks.

It was acquired by Valore, another company in the Boston area, in April 2015. Valore was acquired by Follet, a Westchester, Illinois-based education-products company, in November 2016.

== Products ==
The company's textbooks consisted of educational material taken from free and open sources. This material is often referred to as "open educational resources" (OER). Some of the source material included Wikipedia, the Encyclopedia of Earth, and government websites. The company edited the material and arranged it to create a text in the form of an e-book. In some cases, the company also provided study tools, such as flashcards and quizzes.

The company offered textbooks in over 20 subjects. The company provided two types of books. In an "open" textbook, the contents of each chapter and the arrangement of chapters were defined by the company. In its "alternative" textbooks, the material was arranged in a way that was very similar to a specific, commercially available textbook. Alternative textbooks allowed students to follow class reading and assignments that were based on a commercial text. Each chapter in its alternative texts covered the same concepts as the corresponding chapter in the similar commercial textbook, but using open education resources.

In August 2013, the company began to charge a per-book fee for alternative textbooks. It continued to provide open textbooks (with fewer interactive features) for free. The company launched its "Boundless Teaching Platform" in December 2013. The teaching platform was free. According to the company, the teaching platform allowed instructors to customize the order of textbooks and monitor students' activity through the company's texts.

== See also ==
- BenchPrep
- Chegg
- CourseSmart
- Flat World Knowledge
- Inkling
- OER Commons
- OpenStax
