= Code Reading =

2003 book by Diomidis Spimellis

Code Reading Cover

Code Reading (ISBN 0-201-79940-5) is a 2003 software development book written by Diomidis Spinellis. The book is directed to programmers who want to improve their code reading abilities. It discusses specific techniques for reading code written by others and outlines common programming concepts.

The code examples used in the book are taken from real-life software and uses C to illustrate basic concepts. Excerpts from prominent open-source code systems like the Apache Web server, the hsqldb Java relational database engine, the NetBSD Unix distribution, the Perl language, the Tomcat application server, and the X Window System are presented.

The book inaugurated Addison-Wesley's Effective Software Development Series, edited by Scott Meyers, and received the 2004 Software Development Productivity Award in the “Technical Books” category. It has been translated into Chinese, Greek, Japanese, Korean, Polish, and Russian.

== See also ==
- Code review
