= ContractExpress =

Software company in United Kingdom

- Developer(s): Thomson Reuters
- Operating system: Microsoft Windows
- Type: Document Automation
- Website: legalsolutions.thomsonreuters.co.uk/en/products-services/contract-express.html

Contract Express is a document automation program designed and developed by the Legal Solutions arm of Thomson Reuters, a Canadian multinational mass media and information firm. Contract Express is available as a stand-alone app in a private or public cloud. Users of the product are typically law firms and corporations, such as Clifford Chance and Microsoft.

== History ==
In 1999/2000, Logic Programming Associates partnered with a small London law firm, Tarlo-Lyons, to bring some document assembly technology to market. They formed a new company called Business Integrity Ltd and the product, which was initially called DealBuilder, eventually became Contract Express. The full story is recounted by Clive Spenser, one of the original instigators.

In 2010, BIL launched contractexpress.com as described in an interview with Ken Adams.

In 2015, Thomson Reuters acquired Business Integrity and the company became part of the Legal business of Thomson Reuters. The financial terms of the transaction were not disclosed.

== Functionality ==
Contract Express template creation is conducted entirely within a Microsoft Word interface. As a Microsoft Word App, Contract Express Author integrates into the Microsoft Word ribbon, providing a familiar user experience for users. The add-in provides the ease and speed of automating complex legal documents without the complexity inherent in traditional document assembly tools. Further, generated documents automatically inherit their styling from the marked-up Word document without having to apply styles to each generated document. Authors create a contract template using bracket-based markups to specify conditional text and variable fields for us in their customized templates.

Once published, other users can then manipulate the document using a pre-defined questionnaire to apply client specific details and preferences. Accordingly, the need for programming skills is removed; a basic knowledge of document mark-up is all that is required. It is notable that the field control used is derived from the conventions of traditional legal document mark-up, for example use of square brackets to indicate areas for document specific information.

The most recent version of the software is version 8.0, released in 2019. Contract Express provides users with an intuitive user interface, integrations with key legal software such as DocuSign for safe electronic signature iManage and NetDocuments for storage, and HighQ for client collaboration.

== See also ==
- Document modelling
