= Harlan D. Mills Award =

Software engineering award

Harlan D. Mills Award is an annual award from the IEEE Computer Society created to honor Harlan Mills, a pioneer in software engineering.

The first award was presented in 1999, for "contributions to the theory and practice of the information sciences, [focused on] software engineering". The list of awardees is maintained on the IEEE website.

- 1999 David Parnas
- 2000 Barry Boehm
- 2001 Manny Lehman
- 2002 Jesse H. Poore
- 2003 Victor Basili
- 2004 Elaine Weyuker
- 2006 John C. Knight
- 2007 Bev Littlewood
- 2009 Bertrand Meyer
- 2011 John Rushby
- 2012 Lionel Briand
- 2014 Patrick Cousot and Radhia Cousot
- 2015 Gerard J. Holzmann
- 2016 Wolfram Schulte
- 2017 Pamela Zave
- 2018 Gail C. Murphy
- 2019 Mark Harman
- 2020 Nachiappan Nagappan
- 2021 Dieter Rombach
- 2022 Matthew B. Dwyer
- 2023 David Harel
- 2024 Premkumar Devanbu
- 2025 Bashar Nuseibeh
- 2026 Andreas Zeller
