= Bashar Ahmad Nuseibeh =

British professor

Professor Bashar A. Nuseibeh Ph.D.
- بشار أحمد نسيبة
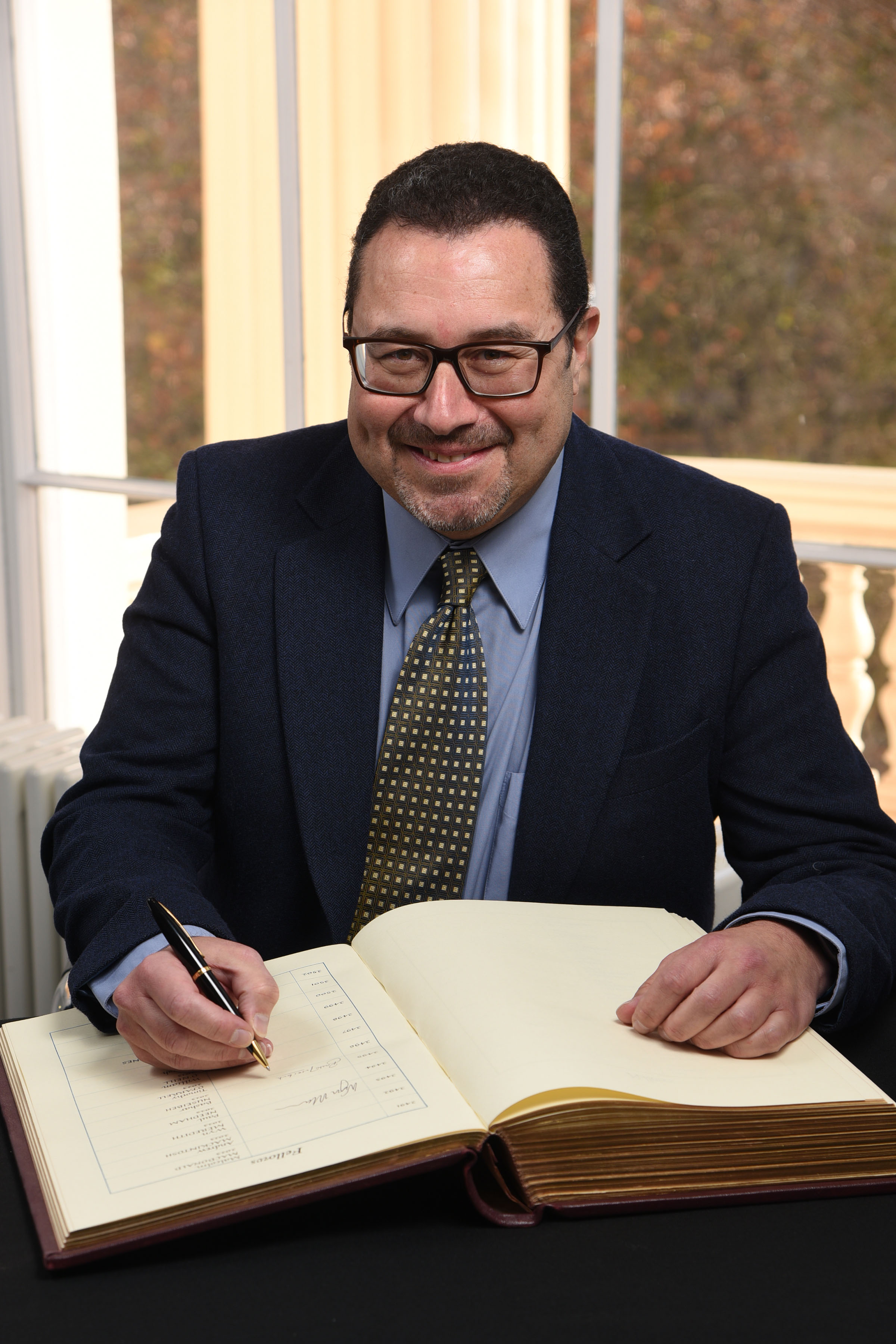
- Nuseibeh in 2023
- Born: June 1967 (age 59); Amman, Jordan
- Citizenship: British
- Education: Imperial College; The University of Sussex
- Known for: Software Engineering; Requirements Engineering; Adaptive Systems; Security & Privacy
- Awards: Philip Leverhulme Prize; Royal Society-Wolfson Merit Award; ICSE Most Influential Paper Award; Member of Academia Europaea; Member of Royal Irish Academy; Fellow of Royal Academy of Engineering; Harlan D. Mills Award.
- Scientific career
- Fields: Computer Science; Software Engineering; Adaptive Systems
- Workplaces: The Open University; UCL; NII; UCD
- Doctoral advisor: Anthony Finkelstein

Bashar Ahmad Nuseibeh (Arabic: بشار أحمد نسيبة; born 1967) is a software engineering researcher and academic. He is professor of computing at City St George's, University of London, where he serves as Executive Dean o the School of Science & Technology.

He is an emeritus professor of computing at The Open University, and former head of its software engineering and design research group.

He is also an honorary professor at University College London, and a visiting professor at Imperial Collage London, the National Institute of Informatics, Japan, and University College Dublin, Ireland.

Previously, he held tenured academic positions as professor of software engineering at the University of Limerick, where he served as the first chief scientist of the Irish Software Research Centre, Lero; and as associate professor (Reader) in computing at Imperial College London, where he founded and headed its software engineering laboratory.

Nuseibeh is internationally recognised as a leading researcher in requirements engineering, adaptive systems, and security, privacy & digital forensics.

== Career ==
Nuseibeh studied at the University of Sussex where he received a First Class Honours BSc in Computer Systems Engineering in 1988. He then moved to Imperial College London to complete his MSc in the Foundations of Advanced Information Technology, awarded in 1989. He remained at Imperial College London for the next decade, firstly to complete his PhD in Software Engineering in 1994, before becoming a postdoctoral researcher. He received his lectureship at Imperial College in 1996, and was promoted to reader in 2000.

In 2001, Nuseibeh moved to the Open University as professor of computing, where he was director of research from 2002 to 2008. From 2009 to 2012, he took a secondment to Lero, The Irish Software Research Centre, as professor of software engineering and chief scientist. In recent years, Nuseibeh has become a leading expert in privacy and security in the field of software development. As a result he received two European Research Council (ERC) grants, including an Advanced Grant on Adaptive Security and Privacy.

Nuseibeh is a visiting professor at Imperial College London, and was a senior visiting researcher at NASA's Independent Validation and Verification (IV&V) Facility, in West Virginia, USA. He is currently also a visiting professor at both University College Dublin (UCD) and the National Institute of Informatics (NII), Japan; and is an honorary professor at University College London (UCL).

== Recognition ==
- IEEE Cyber Humanities Research & Innovation Award (2026)
- Inaugural Member (2026) of the ACM Sigsoft Software Engineering Academy
- Harlan D. Mills Award (2025)
- ACM Fellow (2024)
- Fellow of the Royal Academy of Engineering (RAEng) (2023)
- Requirements Engineering Lifetime Service Award (2021)
- Member of the Royal Irish Academy (RIA) (2021)
- Fellow of the British Computer Society (BCS)
- Fellow of Irish Computer Society (ICS)
- Fellow of the Institution of Engineering & Technology (IET)
- Member of Academia Europaea
- Automated Software Engineering Fellow (2007)
- Royal Society-Wolfson Merit Award (2012)
- Senior Research Fellow of the Royal Academy of Engineering (2005)
- Philip Leverhulme Prize (2002).
- Most Influential Paper Award at International Conference on Software Engineering (ICSE).
- ACM SigSoft Distinguished Service Award
- IFIP Outstanding Service Award
