= Logic Programming Associates =

Software companies of the United Kingdom

Logic Programming Associates Ltd
- Type: Private
- Industry: Computer software
- Founded: 1980
- Headquarters: London
- Area served: UK, United States, EMEA
- Key people: Clive Spenser; Brian Steel
- Products: VisiRule, Flex expert system toolkit, Flint toolkit, LPA Prolog for Windows
- Website: www.lpai.uk, www.visirule.co.uk

Logic Programming Associates (LPA) is a company specializing in logic programming and artificial intelligence software. LPA was founded in 1980 and is widely known for its range of Prolog compilers, the Flex expert system toolkit and most recently, VisiRule.

LPA was established to exploit research at the Department of Computing and Control at Imperial College London into logic programming carried out under the supervision of Prof Robert Kowalski.

== History of LPA Prolog ==
One of the first Prolog implementations made available by LPA was micro-PROLOG which ran on popular 8-bit home computers such as the Sinclair ZX Spectrum and Apple II.

The 8-bit micro-PROLOG interpreter was soon followed by micro-PROLOG Professional one of the first Prolog implementations for the IBM PC running MS-DOS. micro-PROLOG Professional could access all of the 640K memory available under MS-DOS and therefore manage much larger programs

In 1985, LPA released LPA MacProlog which ran on the MacPlus and Mac II computers which could access up to 4 Mb memory. MacProlog was later licensed to Quintus for re-distribution in the USA.

In 1989, LPA started work on a new 32-bit Prolog compiler which could use DOS-extender technology to access up to 4GB memory.

This became the basis for LPA Prolog for Windows, aka WIN-PROLOG, which was then released for Windows 3.0 in 1990.

LPA's core Prolog product is LPA Prolog for Windows, a compiler and development system for the Microsoft Windows platform. The current LPA software range comprises an integrated AI toolset which covers various aspects of Artificial Intelligence including Logic Programming, Expert Systems, Knowledge-based Systems, Data Mining, Agents and Case-based reasoning etc.

As well as continuing with Prolog compiler technology development, LPA has a track record of creating innovative associated tools and products to address specific challenges and opportunities.

== Flex Expert System toolkit ==
In 1989, in response to the rise of interest in Expert Systems and the emergence of products such as Crystal, GoldWorks, NExpert, LPA developed the Flex expert system toolkit, which incorporated frame-based reasoning with inheritance, rule-based programming and data-driven procedures. Flex has its own English-like Knowledge Specification Language (KSL) which means that knowledge and rules are defined in an easy-to-read and understand way.

LPA supported Flex on Windows, DOS and Macintosh PCs, as an add-on toolkit to its various LPA Prolog systems and eanbled LPA to enter the Expert Systems rules-market.

Flex was quickly established as the leading Prolog-based expert system toolkit and was licensed to other Prolog providors on other hardware platforms including Telecomputing Plc to supplement Top One on IBM and ICL mainframes.

Other implementations included Quintec-Flex, Quintus Flex, Poplog Flex and BIM Flex which were all running on Unix and/or Vax/VMS platforms.

POPLOG-Flex was used to build BRAND EVALUATOR - an expert system to assist brand specialists in evaluating the worth of branded products

Quintec-Flex was used to build a hybrid system for the non-linear dynamic analysis/design of coupled shear walls

Flex was adopted by the Open University as part of its course T396, "Artificial intelligence for technology" which was designed by Prof Adrian Hopgood. Some of the teaching material is now available on his AI tookit website.

Flex was also used by David A Ferrucci and Selmer Bringsjord in their storytelling machine, BRUTUS.

== PVG ==
In 1992, LPA helped set up the Prolog Vendors Group, a not-for-profit organization whose aim was to help promote Prolog by making people aware of its usage in industry.

== Business Integrity Ltd and Contract Express ==
Between 1996 and 1998, based on work co-funded through a DTI Smart award, LPA developed ScaffoldIT, a tool for building dynamic documents and intelligent web sites. This technology, built using the LPA Prolog engine and associated ProWeb Server, was able to generate complex, personalised documents such as insurance policy schedules, legal contracts, and complex sales proposals, over the Web.

In 1999/2000, LPA helped set up Business Integrity Ltd, as a Joint Venture with Tarlo-Lyons, to bring the above document assembly technology to market. This product eventually became Contract Express. Contract Express became very popular amongst large law firms and was sold worldwide for both internal and external use.

Partners and GCs liked Contract Express because lawyers were able to quickly and accurately automate and update their legal templates in Word without requiring IT specialists to convert them into programs.

As a result of the commercial success of Contract Express, BIL was acquired by Thomson Reuters in 2015.

The very early days of BIL are described by Clive Spenser here.

== VisiRule ==
In 2004, LPA launched VisiRule a graphical tool for developing knowledge-based and decision support systems. VisiRule was described in IEEE Potentials in 2007 (see Drawing on your knowledge with VisiRule):

VisiRule has been used in various sectors, to build legal expert systems, machine diagnostic programs, medical and financial advice systems, etc.

In 2013, VisiRule was incorporated into Ecosystem Management Decision Support (EMDS) where it has been used to provide enhanced decision support capabilities. EMDS integrates state-of-the-art geographic information system (GIS) as well as logic programming and decision modeling technologies on multiple platforms (Windows, Linux, Mac OS X) to provide decision support for a substantial portion of the adaptive management process of ecosystem management. EMDS is actively used, extended, supported and maintained by Mountain View Business Group (for an in-depth reprise of EMDS see the article in Frontiers in Environmental Science).

In 2023, VisiRule was listed as one of the 5 best decision support software for large enterprises in 2024.

== Customers ==
For many years, LPA has worked closely with Valdis Krebs, an American-Latvian researcher, author, and consultant in the field of social and organizational network analysis. Valdis is the founder and chief scientist of Orgnet, and the creator of the popular Inflow software package.

LPA Prolog and Flex were used to create Allergenius, an expert system for the interpretation of allergen microarray results. Rules representing the knowledge base (KB) were derived from the literature and specialized databases. The input data included the patient's ID and disease(s), the results of either a skin prick test or specific IgE assays and ISAC results. The output was a medical report.
