= Francesca Toni =

Italian computer scientist

- Born: Tuscany, Italy
- Citizenship: Italian
- Education: University of Pisa (Laurea); Imperial College London (PhD)
- Known for: Argumentation for explainable AI; Computational logic
- Awards: JP Morgan/RAEng Research Chair (2020)
- Scientific career
- Fields: Computer science; Computational logic; Argumentation theory; Explainable AI
- Workplaces: Imperial College London
- Thesis: (1995)
- Doctoral advisor: Robert Kowalski
- Website: www.doc.ic.ac.uk/~ft/

Francesca Toni is an Italian computer scientist who works at Imperial College London in the UK as JP Morgan/Royal Academy of Engineering Research Chair in Argumentation for Interactive Explainable AI, Professor in Computational Logic in the Department of Computing, and head of the Computational Logic and Argumentation Group. Her research interests include explainable artificial intelligence, computational logic, argumentation theory, and applications in public health.

== Education and career ==
Toni is originally from "a small town in Tuscany." Initially intending to go into mathematics, she switched to computer science in her last year of high school. She has a laurea (the Italian equivalent of a master's degree) from the University of Pisa, earned in 1990, and completed a doctorate from Imperial College London in 1995. Her dissertation, on abductive logic programming, was supervised by Robert Kowalski.

After working as an intern in Japan and as a postdoctoral researcher in Greece, she returned to Imperial College as a lecturer in 2000. She was appointed as JP Morgan/Royal Academy of Engineering Research Chair in Argumentation in 2020. She is conference chair of IJCAI-ECAI 2026.

== Recognition ==
Toni is a Fellow of the European Association for Artificial Intelligence and the International Association for the Advancement of Artificial Intelligence.
