= Inkling (company) =

American software company

- Industry: Software
- Founded: August 2009; 17 years ago
- Founders: Matt MacInnis; Josh Forman; Robert Cromwell
- Headquarters: San Francisco, California, U.S.
- Key people: Mike Parks, CEO
- Products: Software as a Service and consumer E-books
- Website: Inkling.com

Inkling is an American company based in San Francisco, California. Inkling markets tools for businesses to create, manage, and distribute digital content.

== History ==
Matt MacInnis, Josh Forman, and Robert Cromwell founded Inkling in August 2009. MacInnis became the CEO, with Forman as the VP, Product and Cromwell as the VP, Engineering. In August 2010, the company launched its iPad app and announced partnerships with John Wiley & Sons, McGraw-Hill, and Wolters Kluwer.

The company initially focused on creating interactive e-book versions of existing textbooks. In 2011, it added other types of general-interest non-fiction titles, such as travel guides and cookbooks.

In early 2014, Inkling pivoted from a business-to-consumer model to a business-to-business model.

In August 2014, Inkling was named #105 on the Inc. 500 list of the fastest-growing companies.

As of 2016, the company had raised $95 million in funding.

Inkling was sold to Echo360 in May 2024.

== See also ==
- Apple Books and iBooks Author
- Boundless
- Kno
- Samsung
- Pronoun
