= Jeff Kramer (academic) =

British software engineer and an academic

- Occupations: Software engineer and academic

Academic background
- Education: B.Sc. (ENG), Electrical Engineering; M.Sc., Ph.D., Computing
- Alma mater: University of KwaZulu-Natal; Imperial College London

Jeff Kramer is an emeritus Professor of Distributed Computing at Imperial College London.

Kramer's work has focused on software engineering, including behavior analysis, model-based requirements, self-organizing adaptive systems, distributed computing, and the development of the CONIC and DARWIN environments for distributed programming and software architecture analysis. His work has been published in academic journals such as IEEE Transactions on Software Engineering (IEEE TSE) and ACM Transactions on Software Engineering and Methodology (ACM TOSEM). Additionally, he is a Fellow of the Royal Academy of Engineering.

== Education ==
Kramer completed his B.Sc. in Electrical Engineering from the University of KwaZulu-Natal in 1971, followed by MSc in Computing from Imperial College London in 1972, and a Ph.D. in Computing in 1979 from the same institution.

== Career ==
Kramer began his academic career as a research associate from 1973 to 1976, before being appointed lecturer from 1976 to 1987. He was promoted to senior lecturer in 1987, a position he held until 1990, and then worked as a reader until 1995. During this period, he also worked as the computing expert for the World Bank's project on improving provincial universities in the People's Republic of China. From 1995 to 2021, he was a professor at Imperial College London, and since 2021, he has held the title of emeritus Professor. Additionally, from 2019 to 2024, he was a Distinguished Visiting professor at the Chinese University of Hong Kong. Moreover, he is a visiting professor at the National Institute of Informatics (NII), Tokyo, Japan.

Kramer has held several administrative and professional appointments throughout his career. He worked as Head of the Department of Computing at Imperial College from 1999 to 2004. At Imperial, he was also Dean of the Faculty of Engineering from 2006 to 2009 and Senior Dean from 2009 to 2012. In 2021, the Council of Imperial College London conferred on him the Imperial College Medal. In addition, he was Associate Editor for ACM TOSEM from 1995 to 2001, as well as an Editor-in-Chief of IEEE Transactions on Software Engineering between 2006 and 2009. Furthermore, he has been a chair, program chair, or member of the program committee of many of the major conferences in the software engineering field, such as the International Conference on Software Engineering (ICSE) and the SEAMS International Conference on Software Engineering for Adaptive and Self-Managing Systems, including ICSE Program Chair in 1999 and ICSE General Chair in 2010.

== Research ==
In his early research, Kramer described the CONIC architecture, which emphasized modular software design for distributed computer control systems, enabling flexible interconnection, dynamic runtime modification, and coordination through message-passing to improve scalability and maintainability. Together with Magee, he presented a model for runtime change management in distributed systems, separating structure from application logic, ensuring consistency, minimizing disruption, and demonstrating its principles through the evolving philosophers' problem in the Conic environment. Later, he presented the VOSE framework, which organized system requirements through multiple viewpoints, enabling the design of heterogeneous, composite systems. He illustrated this with an example and described prototype automated tools supporting the framework's application.

Kramer also introduced Darwin, a formal architecture description language for distributed systems. The framework specified static and dynamic structures, used π-calculus for operational semantics, and supported both high-level design and runtime system construction to ensure correctness. He also addressed growing complexity, diversity, and time pressures in consumer electronics software by introducing the Koala component model, which enabled reuse, modularity, and efficient embedded software development, demonstrated through TV systems. He has also explored adaptive, self-managed software architectures that minimized explicit management by enabling components to automatically configure interactions. He emphasized the architectural level for scalability and adaptability by proposing a three-layer reference model for both construction and highlighting research challenges. He also contributed a chapter to the book titled Software Engineering for Self-Adaptive Systems, wherein he surveyed the state-of-the-art in self-adaptive systems, organized across modeling, requirements, engineering, and assurances, and identified key challenges. Moreover, he has published over 250 papers in refereed international journals and conferences and has co-authored books on Concurrency, Distributed Systems and Computer Networks. He has also edited and contributed to the textbook titled Introduction to Digital Humanism which has been downloaded over a million times.

== Awards and honors ==
- 1992 – Fellow, The Institution of Engineering and Technology
- 2001 – Fellow, Association for Computing Machinery
- 2005 – Fellow, British Computer Society
- 2005 – ACM SIGSOFT Outstanding Research Award, ACM SIGSOFT
- 2008 – Fellow, The Royal Academy of Engineering
- 2011 – ACM SIGSOFT Distinguished Service Award, ACM SIGSOFT
- 2021 – The Imperial College Medal, Imperial College London
- 2026 – IEEE Computer Society TCSE Lifetime Achievement Award

== Selected articles ==
- Kramer, J., & Magee, J. (1990). The evolving philosopher's problem: Dynamic change management. IEEE Transactions on Software Engineering, 16(11), 1293–1306.
- Magee, J., Dulay, N., Eisenbach, S., & Kramer, J. (1995). Specifying distributed software architectures. In Proceedings of the 5th European Software Engineering Conference (ESEC ’95) (pp. 137–153). Springer.
- Kramer, J., & Magee, J. (2007). Self-managed systems: An architectural challenge. In L. Briand & A. L. Wolf (Eds.), Future of Software Engineering 2007. IEEE Computer Society Press.
- Magee, J., & Kramer, J. (1999). Concurrency: State models & Java programs (1st ed.). John Wiley & Sons.
- Magee, J., & Kramer, J. (2006). Concurrency: State models & Java programs (2nd ed.). John Wiley & Sons.
- Kramer, J. (2007). Is abstraction the key to computing? Communications of the ACM, 50(4), 36–42.
- Li, T., Zong, W., Wang, Y., Wang, Y., Cheung, S.-C., & Kramer, J. (2023). Nuances are the key: Unlocking ChatGPT to find failing tests with differential prompting. In Proceedings of the 38th IEEE/ACM International Conference on Automated Software Engineering (ASE 2023). Luxembourg.
- Bennaceur, A., Ghezzi, C., Kramer, J., & Nuseibeh, B. (2024). Responsible software engineering: Requirements and goals. In H. Werthner, C. Ghezzi, J. Kramer, J. Nida-Rümelin, B. Nuseibeh, E. Prem, & A. Stanger (Eds.), Introduction to digital humanism – A textbook. Springer.
- Kramer, J. (2025). Reflections of a former editor-in-chief of TSE. IEEE Transactions on Software Engineering, 51(3), 673–676.
