= Sophia Drossopoulou =

Greek computer scientist

- Σοφία Δροσοπούλου
- Born: Athens, Greece
- Education: Karlsruhe Institute of Technology
- Scientific career
- Fields: Programming languages
- Workplaces: Imperial College London
- Thesis: Verschmelzen von Aktionen in Zerteilern (1982)
- Doctoral advisor: Gerhard Goos; Peter Deussen
- Doctoral students: Diomidis Spinellis
- Website: www.doc.ic.ac.uk/~scd/

Sophia Drossopoulou (Greek: Σοφία Δροσοπούλου) is a Greek computer scientist, currently working at Imperial College London, where she is Professor in Programming Languages. She earned her Ph.D. from the Karlsruhe Institute of Technology.

Her research interests are mainly in formal methods for programming languages; her work is notable for a proof of the soundness of the Java programming language.

Her first Ph.D. student was Diomidis Spinellis. She is the daughter of the lawyer and politician Antonis Drossopoulos, and of the author Athena Cacouris (Αθηνά Κακούρη).

She is a lecturer for undergraduate students studying computing and joint mathematics and computer science at Imperial College London. She teaches courses on "logic & reasoning" to first-year students and "models of computation" to second-year students.

In 2023, she was awarded the Dahl–Nygaard Prize for her research in the field of programming languages.

== Bibliography ==
- Uhl, Juergen; Drossopoulou, Sophia; Persch, Guido; Goos, Gerhard; Dausmann, Manfred; Winterstein, Georg; Kirchgaessner, Walter (1982). An Attribute Grammar for the Semantic Analysis of Ada. Lecture Notes in Computer Science. Vol. 139. Springer Science+Business Media. ISBN 978-0-387-11571-9.
- Clarke, D; Drossopoulou, S (2002). "Ownership, encapsulation and the disjointness of type and effect". ACM SIGPLAN Notices. 37 (11): 292–310. doi:10.1145/583854.582447.
- Sophia Drossopoulou, ed. (2008). Lecture Notes in Computer Science. Programming Languages and Systems, 17th European Symposium on Programming (ESOP) (held as part of the Joint European Conferences on Theory and Practice of Software, ETAPS 2008, Budapest, Hungary, March 29-April 6, 2008). Springer. ISBN 978-3-540-78738-9.
- Sophia Drossopoulou, ed. (2009). Lecture Notes in Computer Science. ECOOP 2009 - Object-Oriented Programming, 23rd European Conference, Genoa, Italy, July 6–10, 2009. Springer. ISBN 978-3-642-03012-3.
