= Rosemary Candlin =

Scottish computer scientist (1927–2025)

- Born: 10 April 1927; Plymouth, England
- Died: 10 April 2025 (aged 98); Edinburgh, Scotland
- Education: University of Cambridge Ph.D.
- Employer: CERN
- Known for: crystallographer and computer scientist

Rosemary Candlin (10 April 1927 – 10 April 2025) was an English crystallographer and computer scientist who joined the University of Edinburgh Computer Science Department shortly after it was first established, and for some time was the only woman lecturer on the staff. She worked there from 1968 to 1995, helped design the curriculum in its early years, and developed a specialist interest in parallel programming. She then went on to work for CERN: the European Organization for Nuclear Research.

== Career ==
Candlin studied physics as an undergraduate at the University of Cambridge, and continued her studies at the university with a PhD in crystallography. She had a succession of jobs in crystallography: at the Natural History Museum, London, at Princeton, then back to the University of Cambridge as a research assistant to Helen Megaw.

She moved to the University of Edinburgh, and continued working in crystallography there, using a distant Atlas computer linked to the university by a telephone line. She went on to take up a position at the university's Computer Science Department which had been recently established by Professor Sidney Michaelson FRSE, who wanted her to teach first-year students how to program. Initially there were no other permanent women lecturers. Candlin moved on to teach more advanced students, designed courses on real-time programming, and also on parallel programming which became her speciality.

After leaving the University of Edinburgh in 1995 she worked on physics software for CERN. This work involved ATLAS software.

== Personal life and death ==
Candlin was born Rosemary Shaw in Plymouth in 1927, the only child of Eileen Shaw and Instructor Captain Robert Edward Shaw CBE ADC RN. As a result of World War II the family had to move house several times, and Candlin's schooling was disrupted. She finished her secondary education in Liverpool. In 1955 she married the physicist David Candlin. Candlin died in Edinburgh on 10 April 2025, her 98th birthday.

== Publications ==
- Posie Project Annual Report, University of Edinburgh Department of Computer Science 1988
- A Modelling System for Process-based Programs, Proceedings of the European Simulation Congress 1989
- The Investigation of Communications Patterns in Occam, Developing Transputer Applications: OUG-11: Proceedings of the 11th Occam User Group Technical Meeting, 25–26 September 1989, Edinburgh, Scotland Vol. 11. IOS Press 1989.
- A Statistical Approach to Finding Performance Models of Parallel Programs, in: Hillston, King, Pooley eds., 7th UK Computer and Telecommunications Performance Engineering Workshop, Springer 1991
- Studying the performance properties of concurrent programs by simulation experiments on synthetic programs ACM SIGMETRICS Performance Evaluation Review 20.1 1992 pp239–240.
- A Statistical Study of the Factors that Affect the Performance of a Class of Parallel Programs on a MIMD Computer, in: Proceedings of the IFIP WG10.3 International Conference on Decentralized and Distributed Systems, Springer 1993, pp175–186
- Black Box Representations of Parallel Programs, in: Monique Becker, Luc Litzler, Michel Trehel eds., Transputers '94, IOS Press 1994
- The Posie project: studies to support the design of operating systems for multicomputers, Computer Systems Group, University of Edinburgh 1995
- The dynamic behaviour of parallel programs under process migration, in Concurrency and Computation, October 1995

Some articles co-authored. List not complete.
