= Diomidis Spinellis =

Greek computer science academic

- Διομήδης Σπινέλλης
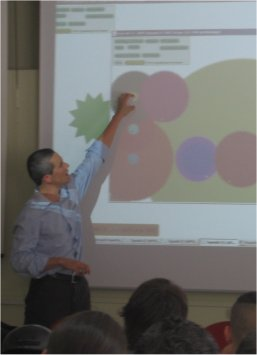
- Spinellis talking about the Antikythera mechanism
- Born: Diomidis D. Spinellis; 2 February 1967 (age 58); Athens, Greece
- Education: Imperial College London (PhD)
- Known for: Code reading
- Awards: International Obfuscated C Code Contest (1988, 1990, 1991, 1995)
- Scientific career
- Fields: Software engineering IT security
- Institutions: Athens University of Economics and Business; Delft University of Technology
- Thesis: Programming paradigms as object classes : a structuring mechanism for multiparadigm programming (1994)
- Doctoral advisor: Susan Eisenbach; Sophia Drossopoulou
- Website: www.spinellis.gr

Diomidis D. Spinellis (Greek: Διομήδης Δ. Σπινέλλης; 2 February 1967) is a Greek computer science academic and author of the books Code Reading, Code Quality, Beautiful Architecture (co-author) and Effective Debugging.

== Education ==
Spinellis holds a Master of Engineering degree in Software Engineering and a Ph.D. in Computer Science both from Imperial College London. His PhD was supervised by Susan Eisenbach and Sophia Drossopoulou.

== Career and research ==
He is a professor at the Department of Management Science and Technology at the Athens University of Economics and Business, and a member of the IEEE Software editorial board, contributing the Tools of the Trade column. Since 2014, he is also editor-in-chief of IEEE Software. Spinellis is a four-time winner of the International Obfuscated C Code Contest in 1988, 1990, 1991 and 1995.

He is also a committer in the FreeBSD project, and author of a number of popular free or open-source systems: the UMLGraph declarative UML diagram generator, the bib2xhtml BibTeX to XHTML converter, the outwit Microsoft Windows data with command line programs integration tool suite, the CScout source code analyzer and refactoring browser, the socketpipe fast inter-process communication plumbing utility and directed graph shell the directed graph Unix shell for big data and stream processing pipelines.

In 2008, together with a collaborator, Spinellis claimed that "red links" (a Wikipedia slang for wikilinks that lead to non-existing pages) is what drives Wikipedia growth.

On 5 November 2009 he was appointed the General Secretary of Information Systems at the Greek Ministry of Finance. In October 2011, he resigned citing personal reasons.

On 20 March 2015 he was elected President of Open Technologies Alliance (GFOSS). GFOSS is a non-profit organization founded in 2008, 36 Universities and Research Centers are shareholders of GFOSS. The main goal of GFOSS is to promote Openness through the use and the development of Open Standards and Open Technologies in Education, Public Administration and Business in Greece. Spinellis uses open-source software to teach software engineering to his students.
