= Lero (software engineering) =

Software engineering research center in Ireland

Lero, also known as the Science Foundation Ireland Research Centre for Software, is a research centre in Ireland overseen by Science Foundation Ireland (SFI). It was established in 2005 as an SFI Centre for Science Engineering and Technology (CSET), being one of nine (originally ten) such centres established by the Irish Government in various areas of science and engineering.

== Overview ==
Hosted at University of Limerick, Lero, the Science Foundation Ireland Research Centre for Software, is home to around 250 researchers across eight Irish universities and three Institutes of Technology. Its research spans a range of application domains from driverless cars to artificial intelligence, cybersecurity, fintech, govtech, smart communities, agtech and healthtech.

Lero brings together researchers from University of Limerick, Dublin City University, University of Galway, Maynooth University, Trinity College Dublin, University College Cork, University College Dublin, Technological University of the Shannon: Midlands Midwest, South-East Technological University, Dundalk Institute of Technology, Atlantic Technological University and Munster Technological University.

Lero engages with industry and has in the region of 50 industry partners. Lero is also the leader of the Blended Autonomous Vehicles (BAV) industry collaboration, a multi-SFI centre initiative and partner in the Enable and FinTech Fusion initiatives.

In October 2019 the Minister for Business, Enterprise, and Innovation launched a 4.2 Million Euro collaboration between Irish academia, and both Irish and global automotive firms. The collaboration was hosted by LERO and was intended to drive innovation in autonomous vehicles and carve Ireland a place among leaders in the space. It included SFI research centres CONNECT and Insight, alongside automotive brands such as Jaguar Land Rover, Liebherr and Irish brands such as Combilift.

== Governance ==
The centre is led operationally by an executive committee. There is also a governance committee which aims to ensure that LERO complies with SFI strategy and expectations, as well as providing insight from industry partners, state agencies and stakeholders to LERO. There is also an external advisory board, whose role is to "ensure maximum scientific benefit from LERO's research and to ensure its focus remains on innovation and commercialisation".

In 2016, Professor Brian Fitzgerald was appointed director of LERO and was succeeded by Professor Lionel Briand in 2024. Professor Nuseibeh returned to the role of chief scientist from 2017 to 2023. The current director is Prof Lionel Briand (UL).

Joe Gibbs was appointed general manager in 2018.
