= Susan Eisenbach =

American computer scientist

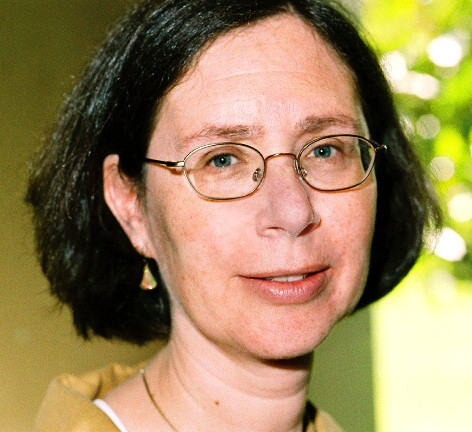
- Education: Vassar College; University of London
- Scientific career
- Fields: Programming languages Concurrency; Testing; Verification; Smart contracts
- Workplaces: Imperial College London
- Doctoral students: Diomidis Spinellis
- Website: www.imperial.ac.uk/people/s.eisenbach

Susan Eisenbach is a computer scientist who is Emeritus Professor of Computer Science at Imperial College London. Her research investigates techniques for producing good software systems that behave appropriately.

== Education ==
Eisenbach completed an undergraduate degree in Mathematics at Vassar College. She completed a master's degree in Mathematical Logic and in Computer Science at the University of London, before working as a school maths teacher.

== Career and research ==
Eisenbach joined the Department of Computing, Imperial College London, in September 1983. In 1994 she was appointed Director of Studies, a role she held for 15 years, with overall responsibility for teaching. She took a college-wide role as Dean of Teaching and Learning in 2010. In January 2011, she was made Head of the Department of Computing, which she completed in September 2016. She has supervised numerous PhD students, including Diomidis Spinellis and others.

She has published several books on programming. In 1981 she published PASCAL for Programmers. She published Program Design with Modula-2 in 1989. She published Reasoned Programming in 1994. Eisenbach's research focuses on how to produce concurrent programs that behave properly.

She has championed entrepreneurship amongst the student community. She is an advisor to the computer education program The Turing Lab, a partnership between Imperial College London graduates and YOOX Net-a-Porter Group. Eisenbach has spoken about the lack of women in technology since 2000. She pointed out that when "computing was less popular, we had far more women students". She was part of a discussion host by The Guardian on how to get more women into technology roles in 2013.
