= David John Candlin =

English physicist (1928–2019)

David John Candlin (1928 in Croydon, Surrey – 4 December 2019) was an English physicist. He was known for developing the path integral formulation of the Fermionic field, inventing Grassmann integration for this purpose. He received his PhD from Cambridge University in 1955, and wrote his influential paper on Grassmann integration shortly thereafter. He was later appointed a lecturer at the University of Edinburgh and retired from this post in 1995. He was at one time involved in collaborative work related to CERN.

In 1955 he married Rosemary Shaw, crystallographer and later computer scientist.
