= Robert Kowalski =

British computer scientist (born 1941)

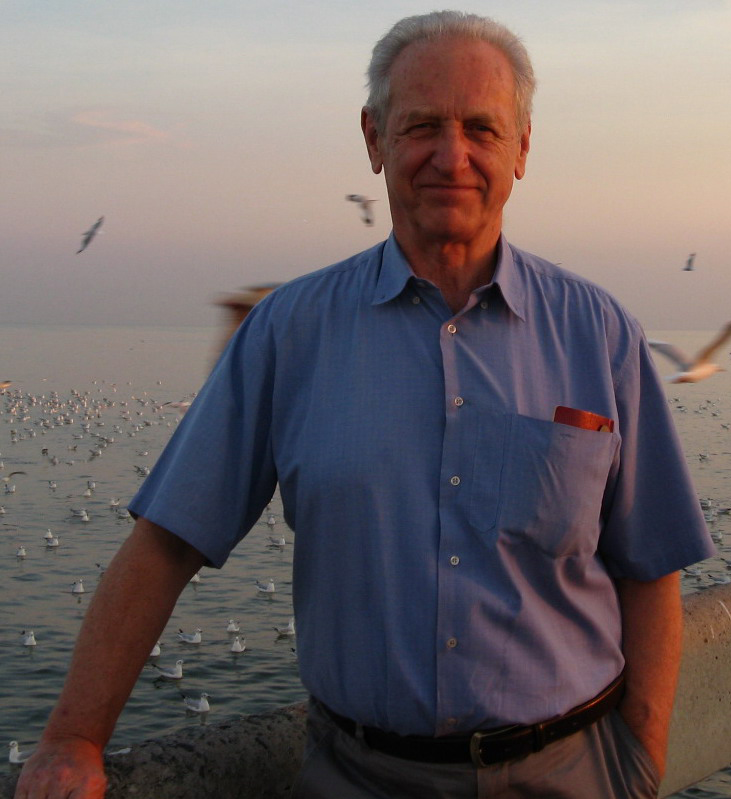
- Born: 15 May 1941 (age 85); Bridgeport, Connecticut, U.S.
- Education: University of Chicago; University of Bridgeport (BA); Stanford University (MSc); University of Warsaw; University of Edinburgh (PhD)
- Known for: Logic programming Prolog; Horn clause Event calculus
- Awards: IJCAI Award for Research Excellence (2011)
- Scientific career
- Fields: Logic; Computer science
- Workplaces: University of Edinburgh; Imperial College London
- Thesis: Studies in the Completeness and Efficiency of Theorem-Proving by Resolution (1970)
- Doctoral advisor: Bernard Meltzer
- Doctoral students: Keith Clark; Francesca Toni; David H. D. Warren

Robert Anthony Kowalski (born 15 May 1941) is an American-British logician and computer scientist, whose research is concerned with developing both human-oriented models of computing and computational models of human thinking. He has spent most of his career in the United Kingdom.

== Education ==
He was educated at the University of Chicago, University of Bridgeport (BA in mathematics, 1963), Stanford University (MSc in mathematics, 1966), University of Warsaw and the University of Edinburgh (PhD in computer science, 1970).

== Career ==
He was a research fellow at the University of Edinburgh (1970–75) and has been at the Department of Computing, Imperial College London since 1975, attaining a chair in computational logic in 1982 and becoming emeritus professor in 1999.

He began his research in the field of automated theorem proving, developing both SL-resolution with Donald Kuehner and the connection graph proof procedure. He developed SLD resolution and the procedural interpretation of Horn clauses, which underpin the operational semantics of backward reasoning in logic programming. With Maarten van Emden, he also developed the minimal model and the fixpoint semantics of Horn clauses, which underpin the logical semantics of logic programming.

With Marek Sergot, he developed both the event calculus and the application of logic programming to legal reasoning. Together, Kowalski and Sergot supervised one of the first use cases of a legal expert system. With Fariba Sadri, he developed an agent model in which beliefs are represented by logic programs and goals are represented by integrity constraints.

Kowalski was one of the developers of abductive logic programming, in which logic programs are augmented with integrity constraints and with undefined, abducible predicates. This work led to the demonstration with Phan Minh Dung and Francesca Toni that most logics for default reasoning can be regarded as special cases of assumption-based argumentation.

In his 1979 book, Logic for Problem Solving, Kowalski argues that logical inference provides a simple and powerful model of problem solving that can be used by both humans and computers. In his 2011 book, Computational Logic and Human Thinking – How to be Artificially Intelligent, he argues that the use of computational logic can help ordinary people to improve their natural language communication skills, and that in combination with decision theory, it can be used to improve their practical problem-solving abilities.

In joint work with Fariba Sadri, he developed the logic and computer language Logic Production Systems (LPS), which integrates much of his previous work on computational logic.

More recently, he has been developing Logical English (LE) as syntactic sugar for Prolog and other logic programming languages. Although writing LE requires special training, understanding LE requires only a reading knowledge of English. Kowalski argues that the restricted syntax of LE resembles the syntax of well-written legal rules and regulations, and he has helped to develop several applications of LE for redrafting legal contracts. He has also advocated its use for introducing logical thinking and writing in education.

Kowalski has a long history of involvement with the use of logic programming to help teach logic at all educational levels, starting with a course of lessons in 1978 for 12-year-old children at his daughters' middle school. These early lessons used a child-friendly syntax for Prolog, which contributed to the later development of Logical English. He is continuing to contribute to the mission of teaching logical thinking through logic programming as co-chair of the Prolog Education Group.

== Honours and awards ==
Kowalski was elected a Fellow of the American Association for Artificial Intelligence in 1991, of the European Co-ordinating Committee for Artificial Intelligence in 1999, and of the Association for Computing Machinery in 2001.

In 2011, he received the IJCAI Award for Research Excellence for his contributions to logic in knowledge representation and problem solving, including work on automated theorem proving and logic programming. He received a Japan Society for the Promotion of Science Award for Eminent Scientists for 2012–2014. In 2021, Kowalski, Fariba Sadri and Marek Sergot received the inaugural CodeX Prize for their application of logic programming to the formalisation and analysis of the British Nationality Act. Their 1986 paper, "The British Nationality Act as a Logic Program", published in Communications of the ACM, was recognised as a pioneering work in computational law.

== Books ==
- Kowalski, Robert (1979). Logic for Problem Solving. North-Holland. ISBN 9780444003683.
- ——— (2011). Computational Logic and Human Thinking: How to be Artificially Intelligent. Cambridge University Press. ISBN 9780521123365.

== See also ==
- Event calculus
- Logic programming
- Prolog
