= Peter Cornwell (computer scientist) =

British computer scientist and media theorist (born 1958)

Peter Cornwell (born 2 July 1958) is a British computer scientist and media theorist. He developed integrated circuits for early parallel computers and undertook pioneering work in high performance computer image generation and public display systems.

== Career ==
Cornwell studied electronics and computing science in London after fine art in the Netherlands, and then joined Texas Instruments, working on the first microprocessors and becoming head of European research for TI's Industrial Systems Division.

He worked as an expert for the EU's European Strategic Program on Research in Information Technology; for the UK's Science and Engineering Research Council on advanced computer architectures and also developed London University's successful bid to establish its Centre for Parallel Computing. His current research is in archive infrastructures and sustainable data.

In 2016 he founded the archive research company data-futures. Since 2016 he is a research fellow at the École normale supérieure lettres et sciences humaines, Lyon. Since 1998 he has run the London media research company "BLIP", which undertook commercial and cultural public display installations, operated an international display infrastructure and funds university research projects. He has exhibited media art in Austria, Finland, Germany, Japan, the U.K. and U.S., organised the 2007 Media Architecture conference and has been visiting professor of computing and art at several Austrian, German and UK universities.

In 1989 Cornwell started Division Inc. a California high performance computer graphics company, developing 3D simulation systems for NASA and aerospace, architecture, networking and pharmaceutical companies. He founded the Visual Theory Group at Imperial College, London, and later became head of the Institute of Visual Media at ZKM, Karlsruhe.
