= Manny Lehman (computer scientist) =

Known for Lehman's laws of software evolution

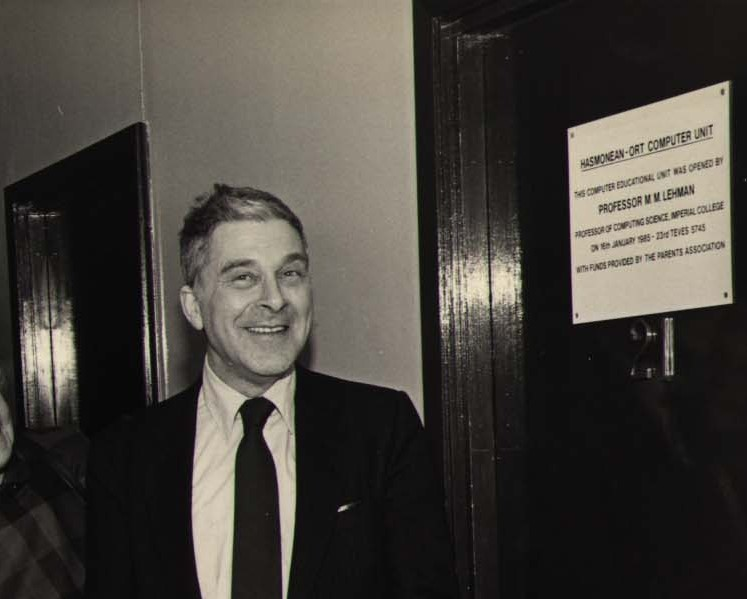
- Born: 24 January 1925; Germany
- Died: 29 December 2010 (aged 85); Jerusalem, Israel
- Education: Imperial College London
- Known for: Lehman's laws of software evolution
- Spouse: Chava Robinson (m. 1953)
- Awards: Harlan D. Mills Award (2001); FREng (2012)
- Scientific career
- Workplaces: Ferranti; Ministry of Defense (Israel); IBM; Imperial College London; Middlesex University
- Thesis: Parallel Arithmetic Units and Their Control (1957)
- Doctoral advisor: K. D. Tocher
- Doctoral students: Peter G. Harrison

Meir "Manny" Lehman, FREng (24 January 1925 – 29 December 2010) was a British software engineer. He was a professor in the School of Computing Science at Middlesex University. From 1972 to 2002 he was a Professor and Head of the Computing Department at Imperial College London. His research contributions include the early realisation of the software evolution phenomenon and the eponymous Lehman's laws of software evolution.

== Career ==
Lehman was born in Germany on 24 January 1925 and emigrated to England in 1931. He studied mathematics as an undergraduate at Imperial College London where he was involved in the design of the Imperial College Computing Engine's Digital Computer Arithmetic Unit. He spent a year at Ferranti in London before working at Israel's Ministry of Defense from 1957 to 1964. From 1964 to 1972, he worked at IBM's research division in Yorktown Heights, NY where he studied program evolution with Les Belady. The study of IBM's programming process gave the foundations for Lehman's laws of software evolution. In 1972, he returned to Imperial College where he was Head of Section and later Head of Department (1979–1984). Lehman remained at Imperial for some thirty years until 2002 when he moved to the School of Computing Science at Middlesex University. After retiring from Middlesex he moved to Jerusalem, Israel, where he died on 29 December 2010.

== Awards and honours ==
- Fellow of the Royal Academy of Engineering (1989)
- Fellow of the ACM (1994)
- Harlan D. Mills Award (2001)
