= Computing Machine Laboratory =

English research centre

The Computing Machine Laboratory at the University of Manchester in the north of England was established by Max Newman shortly after the end of World War II, around 1946.

The Laboratory was funded through a grant from the Royal Society, which was approved in the summer of 1946. He recruited the engineers Frederic Calland Williams and Thomas Kilburn where they built the world's first electronic stored-program digital computer, which came to be known as the Manchester Baby. Their prototype ran its first program on 21 June 1948.
