= K. D. Tocher =

British computer scientist

- Born: 19 March 1921
- Died: 30 December 1981 (aged 60)
- Education: University of London
- Scientific career
- Fields: computer simulation
- Workplaces: University of Southampton
- Thesis: The design and statistical analysis of experiments (1952)
- Doctoral students: Meir M. Lehman

Keith Douglas "Toch" Tocher (19 March 1921 – 30 December 1981) was a computer scientist known for contributions to computer simulation.

Tocher received a first-class BSc in mathematics in 1941 from University College London, a BSc in statistics in 1946 from University of London, and a PhD in 1952 at Imperial College London.

In 1958, he worked for United Steel Companies under Anthony Stafford Beer, and developed the first discrete-event simulation package, the General Simulation Program (GSP), a program that used a common structure to execute a range of simulations.

He was appointed professor of operational research at the University of Southampton in 1980. He was awarded the silver medal of the Operational Research Society in 1967 and served as president from 1972 to 1973.

Tocher was also one of the creators of the SRT division algorithm that is used in the hardware of many modern computers.
