= Bolkestein =

Bolkestein is a surname. Notable people with the surname include:

- Frits Bolkestein (1933–2025), Dutch politician and intellectual;
- Gerrit Bolkestein (1871–1956) Dutch politician, grandfather of Frits;
- Martijn Bolkestein (born 1972), Dutch politician, nephew of Frits.
