= Rad AI =

American healthcare artificial intelligence company

- Type: Private
- Industry: Medical technology
- Founded: 2018
- Founders: Jeff Chang; Doktor Gurson
- Headquarters: San Francisco, California
- Website: radai.com

Rad AI is an American artificial intelligence company that develops generative AI software for radiology workflows to automate report generation, reduce physician burnout, and assist with incidental-finding follow-up.

== History ==
Rad AI was co-founded in 2018 by Dr. Cheng Jeff Chang and entrepreneur Doktor Gurson. The company has headquarters located in San Francisco, California.

In January 2024, the company announced a collaboration with Google Cloud and integrated Google's MedLM into its reporting and impressions platforms.

As of early 2025, the company has raised over $140 million in total funding and has been valued at approximately $525 million.

== See also ==
- Aidoc
- Nuance Communications
- Tempus AI
