= KADS (disambiguation) =

KADS may refer to:

- Knowledge Acquisition and Documentation Structuring, a structured method of developing expert systems
- The ICAO airport code for Addison Airport in Addison, Texas, United States
- Kutcher Adolescent Depression Scale, an adolescent depression rating scale

== Radio stations ==
- KADS 1240 kHz, a radio station in Elk City, Oklahoma, United States
- KOST 103.5 MHz, a radio station in Los Angeles, California, United States that used the KADS callsign from 1966 to 1968
