= Bob Wielinga =

Dutch academic

Bonne Jan "Bob" Wielinga (3 October 1945, Amsterdam – 10 February 2016, Amsterdam) was a Dutch professor at the University of Amsterdam.

Wielinga studied physics at the University of Amsterdam, where he was awarded a PhD in 1972 for a study in nuclear physics. He has performed research on the methodology of knowledge-based system design and knowledge acquisition. In 1986, Wielinga was appointed full professor of Social Science Informatics (SWI) in the Faculty of Psychology. Wielinga leads several research projects, including KADS, ACKnowledge, REFLECT and KADS-II and was one of the main contributors to the development of the KADS methodology for knowledge based system development.

== Publications ==
- Wielinga, Bob J., Schreiber, A. Th. and Breuker, Joost A. "KADS: A modelling approach to knowledge engineering." Knowledge acquisition 4.1 (1992): 5-53.
- Schreiber, August Th.; Akkermans, Hans; Anjewierden, Anjo; Dehoog, Robert; Shadbolt, Nigel; Vandevelde, Walter; Wielinga, Bob (2000), Knowledge engineering and management: the CommonKADS methodology (1st ed.), Cambridge, MA: The MIT Press, ISBN 978-0-262-19300-9

== See also ==
- Knowledge Acquisition and Documentation Structuring
- CommonKADS
- University of Amsterdam
