= CAD system =

The term CAD system can refer to

- Computer-aided design (CAD)
- Computer-aided diagnosis system
- Computer-assisted dispatch
