= Wielinga =

Wielinga is a Dutch surname. Notable people with the surname include:

- Bob Wielinga (1945–2016), Dutch academic
- Remmert Wielinga (born 1978), Dutch cyclist
