= Knowledge engine =

A knowledge engine is part of a decision-support system that combines data with data models and inference rules to provide an interface for people who want to make decisions or discover related data. It may involve automatically extracting and structuring knowledge from less-structured sources, using these models and rules.

== History ==
In the late 1990s, the Decision Support Group at the University of Fribourg developed a model for decision support software. This described the interface between data and models on one hand, and graphical interfaces for exploring them and making decisions on the other, as a knowledge engine. They also developed a mathematical modeling language, LPL, in concert with that work.

With the rise of the semantic web, natural language processing, and topical knowledge bases, a number of other analytical tools have been categorized as knowledge engines, including in genomics (KnowEnG), modeling human action (PaStaNet), and speeding up general-purpose question answering.

General-purpose search and discovery tools such as WolframAlpha have also described themselves as knowledge engines.

== See also ==
- Knowledge engineering
- Knowledge engineer
- Wikimedia Knowledge Engine
