= Expert systems for mortgages =

Type of computer program used in mortgage banking

An expert system for mortgages is a computer program that contains the knowledge and analytical skills of human authorities, related to mortgage banking. Loan departments are interested in expert systems for mortgages because of the growing cost of labor which makes the handling and acceptance of relatively small loans less profitable. They also see in the application of expert systems a possibility for standardized, efficient handling of mortgage loans, and appreciate that for the acceptance of mortgages there are hard and fast rules which do not always exist with other types of loans.

Since most interest rates for mortgages are controlled by the government, intense competition sees to it that a great deal in terms of business depends on the quality of service offered to clients - who shop around for the loan best suiting their needs. Expert systems for mortgages considers the key factors which enter the profitability equation. For instance, “part and parcel of the quality of a mortgage loans portfolio to the bank is the time which elapses between the first contact with the customer and the bank's offering of a loan. Another key ingredient is the fact that home loans have significant features which are not always exploited through classical DP approaches. The expert system corrects this failure”.

The expert system also capitalizes on regulatory possibilities. In France, the government subsidizes one type of loan which is available only on low-cost properties (the HLM) and to lower income families. Known as "prêts Conventionnés", these carry a rate of interest lower than the rate on the ordinary property loan from a bank. The difficulty is that granting them is subject to numerous regulations, concerning both:

- the home which is to be purchased, and
- the financial circumstances of the borrower.

To assure that all conditions have been met, every application has to be first processed at branch level and then sent to a central office for checking, before going back to the branch, often with requests for more information from the applicant. This leads to frustrating delays. Expert system for mortgages takes care of these by providing branch employees with tools permitting them to process an application correctly, even if a bank employee does not have an exact knowledge of the screening procedure.

== Goals and Objectives ==
The expert system neither refuses nor grants loans, but it:

- establishes whether all the conditions for granting a particular type of loan to a given client have been satisfied, and
- calculates the required term of repayment, according to the borrower's means and the security to be obtained from him.

The goal is to produce applications which are correct in 80 per cent to 90 per cent of all cases, and transfer responsibility for granting or refusing loans to the branch offices.

The expert system provides the branch with a significant amount of assistance simply by producing correct applications for a loan. In many cases the client had to choose between different types of loans, and it was planned that expert system should enable bank employees to advise clients on the type of loan which best matched their needs. This, too, has been done and as such contributes to the bank employees' training.

The main tasks of expert system for mortgages focused on:

- the speed of moving a loan through red tape, which management considered to be a very important factor;
- the reduction of the errors made in the filling form;
- the shortening of the turnaround time, which was too long with classical.

Simple expert systems constitute the first phase of a loan application for mortgage purposes. After a prototype is made, the construct should be presented to expert loan officers who, working together with the knowledge engineer(s) will refine the first model. But if there is no first try which is simple and understandable, there will not be complex real-life solutions afterwards.

Whether simple or sophisticated, an expert system for mortgages should be provided with explanation facilities that show how it reaches its decisions and hence its advice. The confidence of the loan officer in the AI construct will be increased when this is done in a convincing manner.

== Application of expert systems for mortgages ==
Expert systems for mortgages find an application for mortgage loans. For example, Federal National Mortgage Association (FNMA), commonly known as Fannie Mae use the Mavent Expert System. Through the Mavent Compliance Console (MC2), the front-end interface to the Mavent Expert System, Fannie Mae review loans for compliance with its policies on the Truth in Lending Act (TILA), federal and state high-cost lending laws, and the points-and-fees test as outlined in the Fannie Mae Selling and Servicing Guide.

Expert systems for mortgages can be used not only in mortgage banking, but also in law. There are some expert system that was developed to assist attorneys and paralegals in the closing process for commercial real estate mortgage loans. "The system identifies the legal requirements for closing the loans by considering the numerous individual features specific to each particular loan. It was felt that an expert system could provide significant benefits to this process, which is extremely complex and involves large amounts of money. To our knowledge, expert systems technology had not previously been applied to this domain. Successful development and implementation of the system resulted in the realization of the anticipated benefits, and a few others as well".

== See also ==
- Artificial intelligence
- Business intelligence
- Logico-linguistic modeling (a method that has been used for building expert systems for mortgages)

The use of expert systems in law is illustrated by the QuickForm Contracts system. It uses a rule-based methodology to automate the drafting of approximately 60 types of agreements for technology and general business transactions. Users answer a series of term sheet level conceptual questions. The system then uses the data recipe to select interchangeable clauses to create a near-custom agreement. The system cuts the time to draft a first-cut document from several days to about 5 minutes.
