= Knowledge-based system =

Computer program that uses a knowledge base and reasoning to solve problems

A knowledge-based system (KBS) is a computer program that reasons and uses a knowledge base to solve complex problems. Knowledge-based systems were the focus of early artificial intelligence researchers in the 1980s. The term can refer to a broad range of systems. However, all knowledge-based systems have two defining components: an attempt to represent knowledge explicitly, called a knowledge base, and a reasoning system that allows them to derive new knowledge, known as an inference engine.

== Components ==
The knowledge base contains domain-specific facts and rules about a problem domain (rather than knowledge implicitly embedded in procedural code, as in a conventional computer program). In addition, the knowledge may be structured by means of a subsumption ontology, frames, conceptual graph, or logical assertions.

The inference engine uses general-purpose reasoning methods to infer new knowledge and to solve problems in the problem domain. Most commonly, it employs forward chaining or backward chaining. Other approaches include the use of automated theorem proving, logic programming, blackboard systems, and term rewriting systems such as Constraint Handling Rules (CHR). These more formal approaches are covered in detail in the Wikipedia article on knowledge representation and reasoning.

== Aspects and development of early systems ==
=== Knowledge-based vs. expert systems ===
The term "knowledge-based system" was often used interchangeably with "expert system", possibly because almost all of the earliest knowledge-based systems were designed for expert tasks. However, these terms tell us about different aspects of a system:

- expert: describes only the task the system is designed for – its purpose is to aid replace a human expert in a task typically requiring specialised knowledge
- knowledge-based: refers only to the system's architecture – it represents knowledge explicitly, rather than as procedural code

Today, virtually all expert systems are knowledge-based, whereas knowledge-based system architecture is used in a wide range of types of system designed for a variety of tasks.

=== Rule-based systems ===
The first knowledge-based systems were primarily rule-based expert systems. These represented facts about the world as simple assertions in a flat database and used domain-specific rules to reason about these assertions, and then to add to them. One of the most famous of these early systems was Mycin, a program for medical diagnosis.

Representing knowledge explicitly via rules had several advantages:

1. Acquisition and maintenance. Using rules meant that domain experts could often define and maintain the rules themselves rather than via a programmer.
2. Explanation. Representing knowledge explicitly allowed systems to reason about how they came to a conclusion and use this information to explain results to users. For example, to follow the chain of inferences that led to a diagnosis and use these facts to explain the diagnosis.
3. Reasoning. Decoupling the knowledge from the processing of that knowledge enabled general purpose inference engines to be developed. These systems could develop conclusions that followed from a data set that the initial developers may not have even been aware of.

=== Meta-reasoning ===
Later architectures for knowledge-based reasoning, such as the BB1 blackboard architecture (a blackboard system), allowed the reasoning process itself to be affected by new inferences, providing meta-level reasoning. BB1 allowed the problem-solving process itself to be monitored. Different kinds of problem-solving (e.g., top-down, bottom-up, and opportunistic problem-solving) could be selectively mixed based on the current state of problem solving. Essentially, the problem-solver was being used both to solve a domain-level problem along with its own control problem, which could depend on the former.

Other examples of knowledge-based system architectures supporting meta-level reasoning are MRS, SOAR, and Jacques Pitrat's CAIA system. The RefPerSys project is an open-source software project aiming to support meta-level reasoning (by C++ code generation).

=== Widening of application ===
In the 1980s and 1990s, in addition to expert systems, other applications of knowledge-based systems included real-time process control, intelligent tutoring systems, and problem-solvers for specific domains such as protein structure analysis, construction-site layout, and computer system fault diagnosis.

=== Advances driven by enhanced architecture ===
As knowledge-based systems became more complex, the techniques used to represent the knowledge base became more sophisticated and included logic, term-rewriting systems, conceptual graphs, and frames.

Frames exemplify this architectural evolution. Introduced by Minsky, frames provide a structured knowledge representation formalism analogous to object-oriented programming paradigms. They are a way representing world knowledge using techniques that can be seen as analogous to object-oriented programming: a frame consists of a data structure with named slots that represent attributes or relations, organized hierarchically through class-subclass relationships. Each slot can contain values, default values, procedural attachments, and constraints that govern permissible values. With the knowledge base more structured, reasoning could now occur not only by independent rules and logical inference, but also based on interactions within the knowledge base itself. For example, procedures stored as daemons on objects could fire and could replicate the chaining behavior of rules.

=== Advances in automated reasoning ===
Another advancement in the 1990s was the development of special purpose automated reasoning systems called classifiers. Rather than statically declare the subsumption relations in a knowledge-base, a classifier allows the developer to simply declare facts about the world and let the classifier deduce the relations. In this way a classifier also can play the role of an inference engine.

The most recent advancement of knowledge-based systems was to adopt the technologies, especially a kind of logic called description logic, for the development of systems that use the internet. The internet often has to deal with complex, unstructured data that cannot be relied on to fit a specific data model. The technology of knowledge-based systems, and especially the ability to classify objects on demand, is ideal for such systems. The model for these kinds of knowledge-based internet systems is known as the Semantic Web.

== See also ==
- Knowledge representation and reasoning
- Knowledge modeling
- Knowledge engine
- Information retrieval
- Reasoning system
- Case-based reasoning
- Conceptual graph
- Neural networks
