= Rob Mokken =

Dutch political scientist

Robert Jan (Rob) Mokken (born 28 April 1929) is a Dutch political scientist and Emeritus Professor of Political Science and Methodology at the University of Amsterdam.

== Biography ==
Born in Batavia, Dutch East Indies, Mokken began his studies at the Royal Netherlands Naval College in Den Helder from 1949 to 1952. He proceeded to study at the University of Amsterdam, where in 1957 he obtained his BA in Political and Social sciences, in 1961 his MA, and in 1970 his PhD with the thesis entitled "A theory and procedure of scale analysis: with applications in political research" under the supervision of Jan Hemelrijk.

In 1954, Mokken started as a research assistant at the University of Amsterdam. From 1961 to 1966, he worked at the Centrum Wiskunde & Informatica. After another three years at the University of Amsterdam as a research assistant, in 1970, he was appointed Professor at the University of Amsterdam in Political and Social Science, and since 1979 in Political Science and Methodology. Among his about 20 doctoral students were Frans Stokman (1977), Robert de Hoog (1978), Willem Saris (1979), and Meindert Fennema (1981). In 1994, he retired and is still working as an ICT consultant concerning statistical and quantitative methods.

Mokken published the book Theory and Procedure of Scale Analysis, in 1971, in which he proposed a measure later named after him: the Mokken scale.

In 1990, Mokken was awarded a knighthood in the Order of Orange-Nassau.

== Publications ==
Mokken has published several books and many articles. A selection:

- 1971. A theory and procedure of scale analysis with applications in political research
- 1975. Graven naar macht: op zoek naar de kern van de Nederlandse economie. With H.M. Helmers, R.C. Plijter & F.N. Stokman.
- 1997. Technologie en management: bestuursstructuren in industriële ondernemingens. With B.L. Icke and H. Disk.
