= Raidium =

French medical technology company

Raidium is a French medical imaging startup company that develops radiology-focused artificial intelligence, founded in 2022 and based in Paris.

== Overview ==
Raidium builds foundation models for three-dimensional CT scans and Magnetic Resonance Imaging (MRI), and integrates them into an interactive radiology viewer used for image analysis and the extraction of imaging biomarkers for clinical workflows and clinical trials.

In 2024, Raidium was selected for the EIC Accelerator program of the European Innovation Council (EIC).

Later that year, the company announced a €16 million seed round backed by several investors, including Newfund and the European Innovation Council Fund.

== Awards and Recognition ==
- Amgen Golden Ticket (BioLabs Hôtel-Dieu, 2023) – Winner of Amgen France's first Golden Ticket competition at BioLabs, Hôtel-Dieu, Paris
- i-Lab Innovation Contest, Grand Prix (2024) – French government's i-Lab innovation contest
- Station F – Future 40 (2024), highlighting 40 high-growth startups from the Paris campus.
- "AI for Health" Challenge (2025) – Winner of contest organized by the Île-de-France Region and Hôpital Fondation Adolphe de Rothschild.

== See also ==
- Aidoc
