= Newfund =

Newfund Management
- Type: Venture capital
- Founded: 2008
- Headquarters: Paris, France
- Key people: François Véron, Patrick Malka, Henri Deshays
- Website: newfundcap.com

Newfund is a venture capital firm focused on early stage investment in France and the United States. Founded in 2008, it had raised more than €400 million in funding by 2025, mostly from entrepreneurs, business leaders, and family offices. It typically invests between €500,000 and €2m per company. It has repeatedly been listed among the most significant venture capital funds in France.

== Investments ==
Newfund's geographical scope of investment is in France and the United States, including a dedicated fund in the Nouvelle-Aquitaine Region and the Basque Country initiated in December 2018. Its sectoral scope has included web-enabled services, health technology, financial technology, and since 2021, neuroscience and mental health.

Notable companies in which Newfund is an investor include Aircall, a cloud-based phone services provider; Datagalaxy, a data knowledge platform supporting data culture within companies. In the health and robotics sector, investments include In2Bones, a medical device designer and manufacturer; Medtech, a robotic surgery company listed on Euronext Paris in November 2013 and acquired by Zimmer Biomet in 2016; and Raidium, a company developing an artificial intelligence software for radiology. In the energy and infrastructure sector, Newfund has backed Camping Car Park, a European network of 24/7 service areas for camper vans; Eqinov, a low-carbon energy efficiency services provider acquired by Acciona Energy in 2022; and Luckey Homes, a short-term rental concierge service acquired by Airbnb in 2018. In the consumer and services space, investments include Advitam, an online funeral services platform, and Shotgun, a social platform for live event and party discovery. In fintech, Newfund is an investor in FairMoney, a digital banking app with over five million users in Nigeria.

== Team ==
François Véron, a former board member of trade body AFIC (Association Française des Investisseurs en Capital, renamed France Invest in January 2018), created Newfund in 2008.

== See also ==
- Iris Capital
