= Meindert Fennema =

Dutch political scientist (1946–2023)

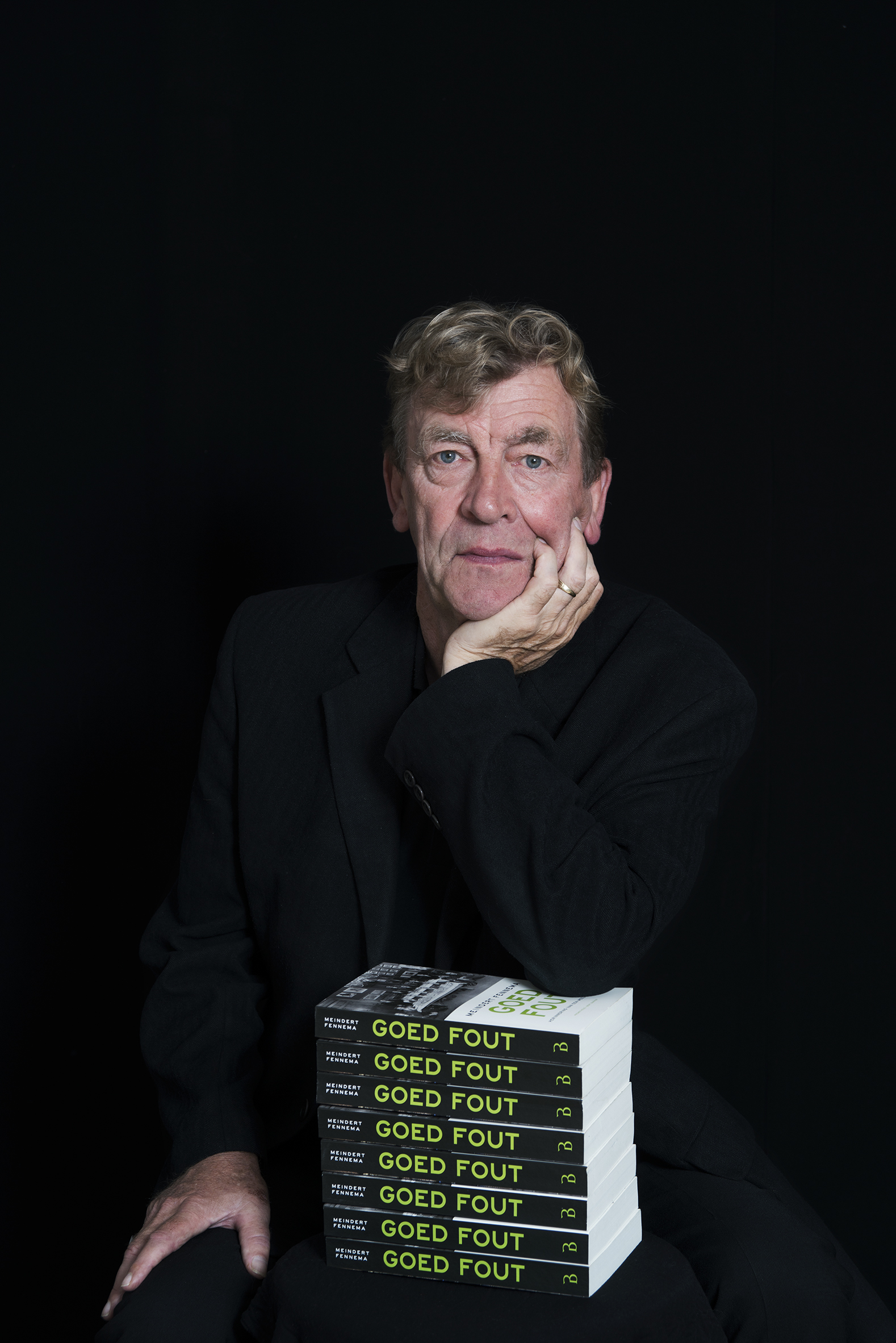

Meindert Fennema (21 May 1946 – 12 June 2023) was a Dutch political scientist and Emeritus Professor of political science, who was attached to the Department of Political Science and the Institute for Migration and Ethnic Studies of the University of Amsterdam, where he held the chair on Political Theory of Ethnic Relations.

== Biography ==
Born in Leeuwarden, Fennema grew up in Zeist in a Frisian family, where they spoke Frisian. His father was inspector of the public slaughterhouse in Zeist.

After graduating high school he worked for the Holland America Line at the SS Rotterdam. He studied Sociology at the Utrecht University, and became member of the Utrechtsch Studenten Corps. He further studied Political Science at the University of Amsterdam (1969–1973). In 1970 he was assistant at the Europa-instituut in Amsterdam.

Fennema participated in the student movement and was involved in the 'affair Daudt' - Professor Hans Daudt had to resign after sustained criticism from students (who wanted more 'socially critical' courses). In his place, a number of other teachers were assigned, including Fennema. In 1972 he joined the Communist Party of the Netherlands, where he remained until the abolition of the party in 1989. He later became critic of the "leftist elite", especially the leaders of the Labour Party, as Roel in 't Veld and Bram Peper. He only kept supporting GreenLeft.

From 1975 he was a lecturer at the University of Amsterdam. In 1981 he obtained his doctorate with the thesis entitled "International Networks of Banks and Industry" under supervision of Rob Mokken. In 2002 he became a professor. He has published many scientific publications in the field of anti-immigration parties, ethnic organizations and the economic and political elites. Fennema also intervened frequently in the public debate with contributions on the opinion pages of national newspapers. With John Rhijnsburger he wrote a biography of Hans Max Hirschfeld (Man van het grote geld, 2007). In 2010 he published a biography of Geert Wilders entitled Geert Wilders, tovenaarsleerling.

On 11 May 2012, he held his farewell lecture, titled: Help! De elite verdwijnt!. (Help! The elite is disappearing!). From August 2012 he wrote a weekly column on The Volkskrant.nl. On 27 August 2013, he presented his first novel Het slachthuis (The Slaughterhouse) in De Balie in Amsterdam. At that meeting the Blue Diamond Riem de Wolff, one of the characters in the book, sung 'Ramona'.

Fennema managed the archives of Hans Janmaat. For years he was one of the few who openly supported Janmaat's right to freedom of expression. He was councilor for GreenLeft in Bloemendaal.

Fennema died on 12 June 2023, at the age of 77.

== Publications ==
Meindert has authored and co-authored numerous publications in his field of expertise

- De Multinationale Onderneming en de Nationale Staat. SUA, Amsterdam, 1975.
- International Networks of Banks and Industry. Martinus Nijhoff, The Hague/Boston, 1982.
- Het politicologendebat: wat is politiek?. With Ries van der Wouden(eds.). Van Gennep, Amsterdam, 1982
- Het Nederlands Belang bij Indië. With Henri Baudet a.o. Het Spectrum, Utrecht/Antwerpen, 1983.
- Communist Parties in Western Europe. Decline or adaptation?. With Michael Waller (eds.) Basil Blackwell, Oxford, 1988.
- Racistische Partijen in West-Europa.Tussen nationale traditie en internationale samenwerking. With Frank Elbers. Stichting Burgerschapskunde, Amsterdam 1993.
- Politiek Racisme. Oorzaken, denkbeelden en bestrijding. With Frank Elbers and Leo Balai. AFS/ LBR/SBK. Leiden, 1994.
- De Moderne Democratie. Geschiedenis van een Politieke Theorie, revised edition, Amsterdam, Het Spinhuis, 2001
- Onrecht. Oorlog en rechtvaardigheid in de twintigste eeuw. With Madelon de Keizer; Mariska Heijmans-van Bruggen; Erik Somers & Cees Maris] (ed.) Walburg Pers, Zutphen, 2001.
- Over de kwaliteit van politieke elites. Vossiuspers, Amsterdam, 2003.
- Nederlandse Elites in de twintigste eeuw. Continuïteit en verandering. With Huibert Schijf (eds.) Amsterdam University Press, Amsterdam, 2004.
- Geldt de vrijheid van meningsuiting ook voor racisten? Elsevier, Amsterdam, 2009.
- Dr. Hans Max Hirschfeld. Man van het Grote Geld, With John Rhijnsburger, Amsterdam, Bert Bakker, 2007
- Nieuwe Netwerken. De ondergang van NV Nederland, With Eelke Heemskerk Amsterdam, Bert Bakker, 2008
- Geert Wilders. Tovenaarsleerling, Amsterdam, Bert Bakker, 2010
- Van Thomas Jefferson tot Pim Fortuyn. Balans van de Democratie, Apeldoorn, Spinhuis, 2012
- Help, de elite verdwijnt!, Amsterdam, Bert Bakker, 2012
- Het slachthuis - een roman. Amsterdam, Prometheus, August 2013
- Goed Fout. Herinnering van een meeloper. Amsterdam, Prometheus, 2015
- De succesvolle mislukking van Europa, co-edited with Frits Bolkestein and Paul Cliteur, 2015, Houtekiet
- Dorpspolitiek. Waar is het lokale gezag? With Martijn Bolkestein, Amsterdam, Prometheus, 2018
- Het Ancien Régime en de Revolutie Naschrift bij de Nederlandse vertaling. Amsterdam, Boom, 2019

=== About Fennema ===
- Dante Germino, Meindert Fennema: Political Theory from a Polder Perspective. The Review of Politics, Fall 2001: 783-804.
- Sofie CERUTTI, De oude elite, die was zo slecht nog niet, in: Trouw, 12 mei 2012
- Thierry Baudet & Geerten Waling, Jarenlang was Fennema de enige die het openlijk opnam voor het recht van Janmaat om vrijuit te spreken, in: De Volkskrant, 14 mei 2012
