= Robert de Hoog (scientist) =

Dutch social scientist (born 1944)

Robert de Hoog (born 3 October 1944) is a Dutch social scientist and Emeritus Professor Information and knowledge management at the University of Twente, known for his contributions in the field of scientific modelling.

== Biography ==
De Hoog was born in Nieuwer-Amstel. He received his PhD in 1978 at the University of Amsterdam with a thesis entitled "Politieke voorkeur: oordelen en beslissen" under supervision of Robert J. Mokken.

After graduation De Hoog started his academic career at University of Amsterdam as researcher for the Instituut voor Wetenschap der Andragogie IWAL (Institute for Scientific Andrology), where mid-1980s he became Associate Professor of Social Science Informatics. In 2000, he moved to the University of Twente, where he was appointed became Associate Professor Information and knowledge management. Among his doctoral students were Suzanne Kabel (1996), Lambertus van Wegen (1996), Michiel Kuijper (1998) and Maarten Sierhuis (2001).

De Hoog's research interests are in the fields of "artificial intelligence, expert systems, knowledge based information retrieval and knowledge management... [and] the EU funded KITS projects which has built a comprehensive knowledge management learning simulation game and the METIS project which focuses on knowledge mapping techniques and methods using different ontologies."

== Publications ==
De Hoog published several books and many articles and over 200 articles. Books, a selection:

- 1978. Politieke voorkeur: oordelen en beslissen. Doctoral thesis
- 1980. Veranderen door onderzoek : bijdragen uit de andragologie. With Harry Stroomberg and Hendrik van der Zee (eds.). Meppel : Boom
- 1990. Ontwerpen van kennissystemen : een onderzoek naar organisatorische aspecten. With Karel Sommer and Michel Vogler. Den Haag : Nederlandse Organisatie voor Technologisch Aspectenonderzoek (NOTA)
- 1999. Knowledge engineering and management. With Guus Schreiber, Hans Akkermans, Anjo Anjewierden, Nigel Shadbolt, Walter Van de Velde, and Bob Wielinga.

Articles, a selection:

- Guus Schreiber, Bob Wielinga, Robert de Hoog, Hans Akkermans, and Walter Van de Velde, W. (1994). "CommonKADS: A comprehensive methodology for KBS development". IEEE expert, 9(6), 28–37.
- Karl M. Wiig, Robert De Hoog, and Rob Van Der Spek. "Supporting knowledge management: a selection of methods and techniques." Expert systems with applications 13.1 (1997): 15–27.
- Jeff Wilkins, Bert Van Wegen, and Robert De Hoog. "Understanding and valuing knowledge assets: overview and method." Expert Systems With Applications 13.1 (1997): 55–72.
