= Jacques Pitrat =

French artificial intelligence scientist (1934–2019)

Jacques Pitrat (February 1934 — October 2019) was one of the French symbolic artificial intelligence pioneers. He developed knowledge based systems, expert systems, and theorem provers, and was a strong advocate of meta-knowledge based systems.

Graduated from École Polytechnique, and member of the Corps de l'armement, he began his career at the Laboratoire Central de l'Armement (French equivalent of DARPA) from 1959 to 1967. In 1966 he defended his Habilitation thesis (Doctorat d'État) about a theorem proving software using meta-theorems.

He worked at the CNRS from 1967 till his retirement, ending his career as emeritus research director at the end of 2015. He taught artificial intelligence at the Université Pierre et Marie Curie in Paris from 1967 till 1998. He was elected an AAAI Fellow in 1994.

== Published books ==
- Réalisation de programmes de démonstration de théorèmes utilisant des méthodes heuristiques. Thesis, 1966.
- Un programme de démonstration de théorèmes. Monographies d'informatique de l'AFCET. Dunod. 1970.
- Textes, ordinateurs et compréhension. Eyrolles. 1985. Translated to English : An artificial approach to understanding natural language. North Oxford Academic (Grande-Bretagne) et GP Publishing (USA) 1988.
- Métaconnaissance, Futur de l'Intelligence Artificielle. Hermès. 1990.
- Penser autrement l'informatique. Hermès. 1993.
- De la machine à l'intelligence. Hermès. 1995.
- Artificial Beings - The conscience of a conscious machine ISTE, Wiley, Mars 2009. ISBN 978-1848211018

== Web resources ==
- French wikipedia page about Jacques Pitrat
- LIP6 page
- Bootstrapping Artificial Intelligence blog
- Seminar (march 2020, in French) in honor of Jacques Pitrat
- French wikipage (more detailed) about Jacques Pitrat
- an open source software AI system inspired by Pitrat (RefPerSys - REFlexive PERsistent SYStem)
- the self-generated source code of CAIA, the last software created by Jacques Pitrat
