= Edward Feigenbaum =

American computer scientist

Ed Feigenbaum
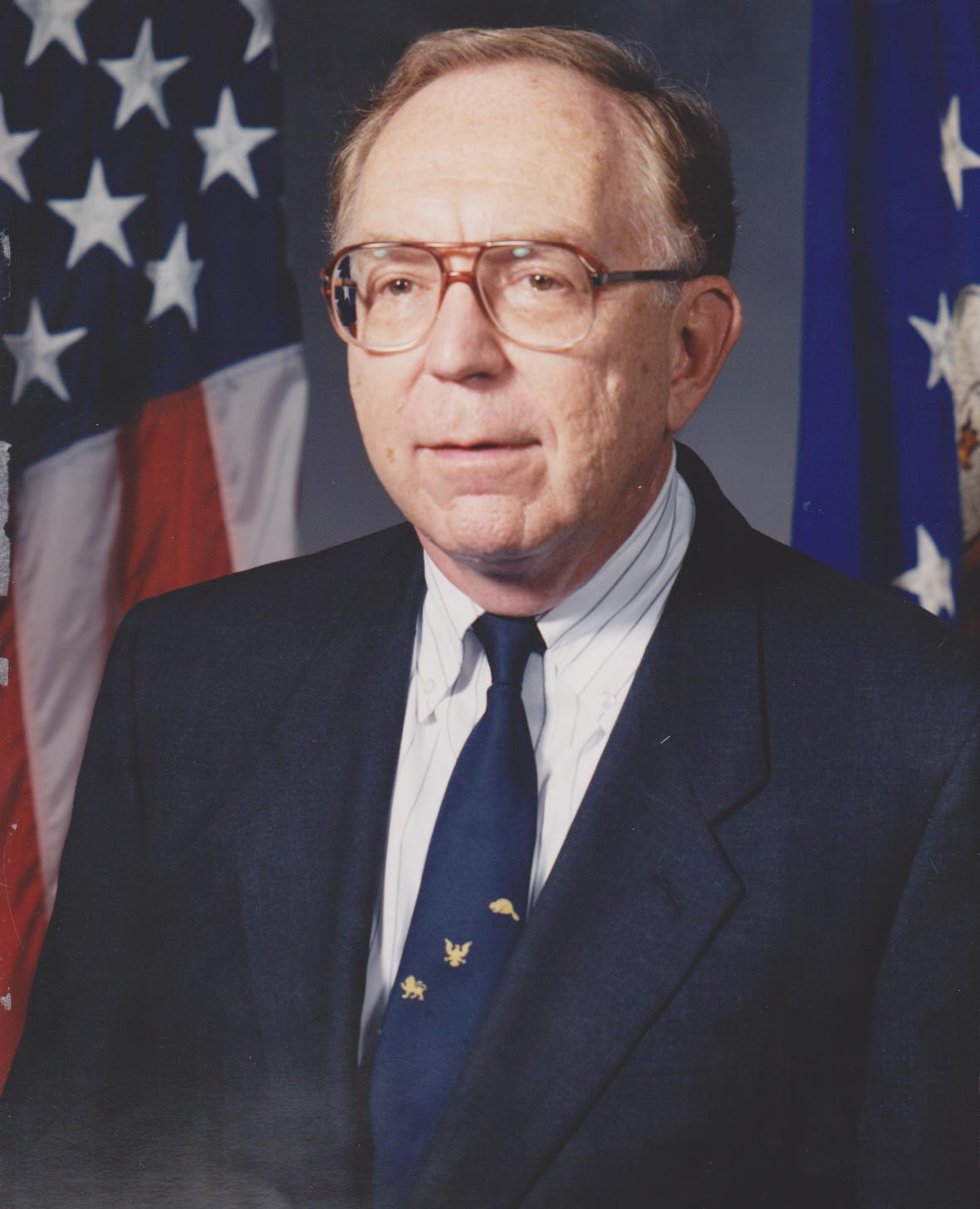
- Official portrait, 1994
- Born: Edward Albert Feigenbaum; January 20, 1936 (age 90); Weehawken, New Jersey
- Education: Carnegie Mellon University (BS, MS, PhD)
- Known for: Expert systems EPAM; DENDRAL project Feigenbaum test
- Awards: Turing Award (1994); Computer Pioneer Award; AAAI Fellow (1990); ACM Fellow (2007)
- Scientific career
- Fields: Computer science Artificial intelligence
- Workplaces: Stanford University; United States Air Force
- Doctoral advisor: Herbert A. Simon
- Doctoral students: Ramanathan V. Guha: Alon Halevy; Peter Karp; Niklaus Wirth
- Website: ksl-web.stanford.edu/people/eaf

Edward Albert Feigenbaum (born January 20, 1936) is an American computer scientist working in the field of artificial intelligence, and with Raj Reddy he won the 1994 ACM Turing Award. He is often called the "father of expert systems".

== Education and early life ==
Feigenbaum was born in Weehawken, New Jersey in 1936 to a culturally Jewish family, and moved to nearby North Bergen, where he lived until the age of 16, when he left to start college. His hometown did not have a secondary school of its own, and so he chose Weehawken High School for its college preparatory program. He was inducted into his high school's hall of fame in 1996.

Feigenbaum completed his undergraduate degree (1956), and a Ph.D. (1960), at Carnegie Institute of Technology (now Carnegie Mellon University). In his PhD thesis, carried out under the supervision of Herbert A. Simon, he developed EPAM, one of the first computer models of how people learn.

During undergrad years, Feigenbaum took a graduate-level course called "Ideas and Social Change" taught by James March. March introduced him to Herbert Simon. Feigenbaum took a course "Mathematical Models in the Social Sciences" taught by Simon, where Simon announced the Logic Theorist with "Over the Christmas holidays, Al Newell and I invented a thinking machine." Simon gave Feigenbaum a manual of IBM 701, which he read in one night. Feigenbaum later called it a "born-again experience".

== Career and research ==
Feigenbaum completed a Fulbright fellowship at the National Physical Laboratory (United Kingdom) and in 1960 went to the University of California, Berkeley, to teach in the School of Business Administration. He joined the Stanford University faculty in 1965 as one of the founders of its computer science department. He was the director of the Stanford Computation Center from 1965 to 1968. He established the Knowledge Systems Laboratory at Stanford University. Important projects that Feigenbaum was involved in include systems in medicine, as ACME, MYCIN, SUMEX, and Dendral. He also co-founded companies IntelliCorp and Teknowledge.

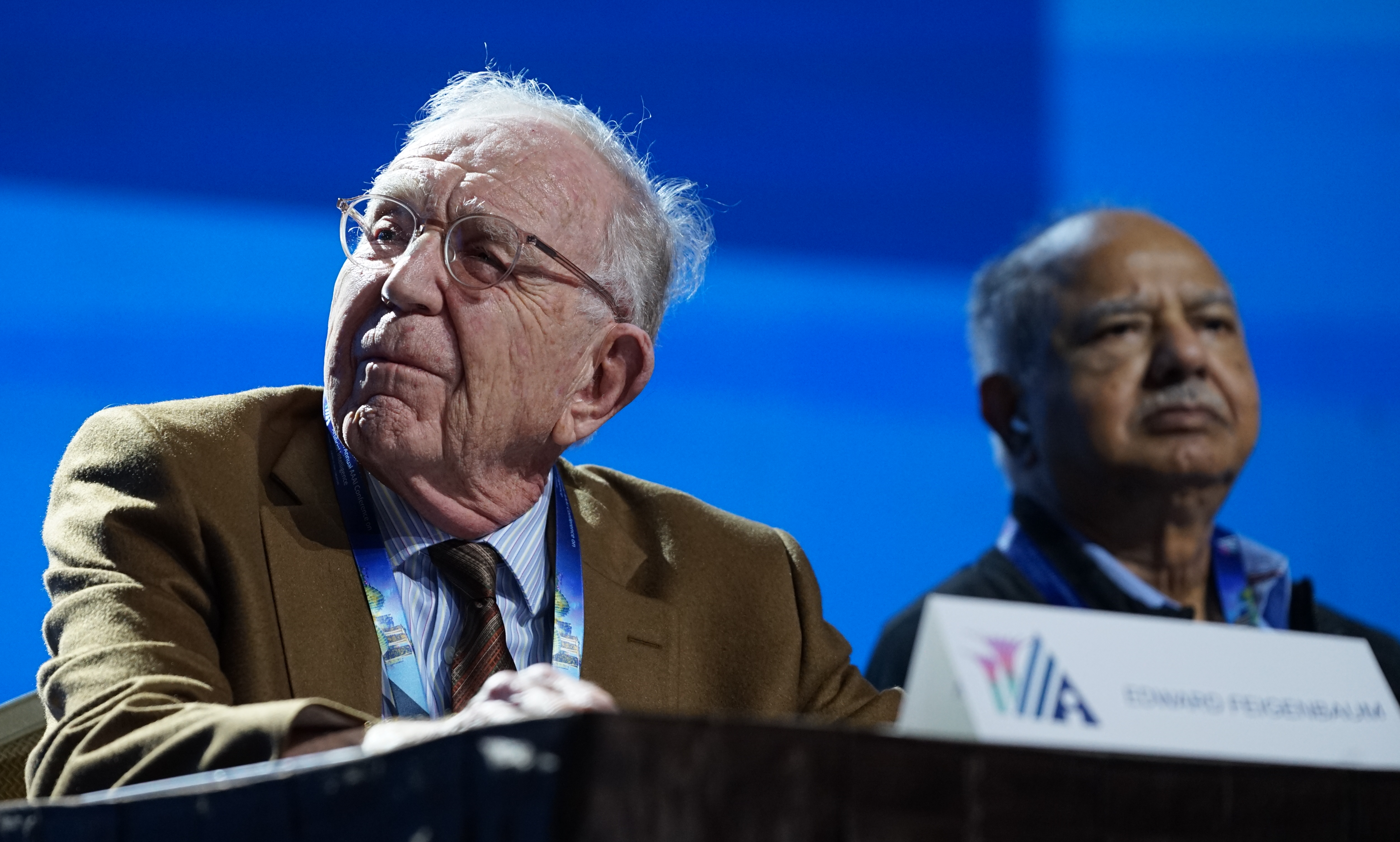
Feigenbaum and Raj Reddy honored at AAAI 2026

Teknowledge was founded in July 1981 by 20 computer scientists from Stanford University, MIT, and the Rand Corporation. The company's staff "represent about 1/3 of the world's high-level expertise in the design and development of knowledge systems". Its aim was to allow people without training in knowledge-engineering technology to use it for commercial and industrial applications.

In 2000, Feigenbaum became a Professor Emeritus of Computer Science at Stanford University. His former doctoral students include Peter Karp, Niklaus Wirth, and Alon Halevy.

In January 2026, the Association for the Advancement of Artificial Intelligence (AAAI) honored Feigenbaum at its 40th annual conference in Singapore in celebration of his 90th birthday, recognizing his foundational contributions to the field of expert systems.

=== Honors and awards ===
- 1984: Selected as one of the initial fellows of the American College of Medical Informatics (ACMI)
- 1986: Elected a member of the National Academy of Engineering for pioneering contributions to knowledge engineering and expert systems technology, and for leadership in education and technology of applied artificial intelligence.
- 1994: Turing Award jointly with Raj Reddy for "pioneering the design and construction of large scale artificial intelligence systems, demonstrating the practical importance and potential commercial impact of artificial intelligence technology".
- 1997: U.S. Air Force Exceptional Civilian Service Award
- 2007: Inducted as fellow of the Association for Computing Machinery (ACM)
- 2011: The AAAI established the Feigenbaum Prize, awarded biennially for outstanding AI research advances.
- 2011: IEEE Intelligent Systems AI's Hall of Fame for "significant contributions to the field of AI and intelligent systems".
- 2012. Made fellow of the Computer History Museum "for his pioneering work in artificial intelligence and expert systems."
- 2013. IEEE Computer Society Computer Pioneer Award for "pioneering work in Artificial Intelligence, including development of the basic principles and methods of knowledge-based systems and their practical applications".

== Works ==
- Feigenbaum, Edward; Feldman, Julian, eds. (1963). Computers and thought : a collection of articles (1 ed.). New York: McGraw-Hill. OCLC 593742426.
- Barr, Avron; Feigenbaum, Edward A. (1981). The Handbook of artificial intelligence, volume 1. Stanford, CA; Los Altos, CA: HeurisTech Press; William Kaufmann. ISBN 978-0-86576-004-2.
- Barr, Avron; Feigenbaum, Edward A. (1982). The Handbook of artificial intelligence, volume 2. Stanford, CA; Los Altos, CA: HeurisTech Press; William Kaufmann. ISBN 978-0-86576-006-6.
- Cohen, Paul R.; Feigenbaum, Edward A. (1982). The Handbook of artificial intelligence, volume 3. Stanford, CA; Los Altos, CA: HeurisTech Press; William Kaufmann. ISBN 978-0-86576-007-3.
- Barr, Avron; Cohen, Paul R.; Feigenbaum, Edward A. (Edward Albert) (1989). Handbook of artificial intelligence, volume 4. Reading, MA: Addison Wesley. ISBN 978-0-201-51731-6.
- Feigenbaum, Edward A.; McCorduck, Pamela (1983). The fifth generation: artificial intelligence and Japan's computer challenge to the world. Reading, Mass: Addison-Wesley. ISBN 978-0-201-11519-2.
- Feigenbaum, Edward A.; McCorduck, Pamela; Nii, H. P. (1988). The rise of the expert company: how visionary companies are using artificial intelligence to achieve higher productivity and profits. London: Macmillan London. ISBN 978-0-333-49659-6.
