= Information search =

Information search may refer to:

- use of a Search engine (tool centered view)
- Information seeking or
- Information behavior (user centered view)
- Information retrieval (technical process)
