= Xcon =

Rule-based system for configuring computers

The R1, internally called XCON (Expert Configurer), program was a production-rule-based system written in OPS5 by John P. McDermott of Carnegie Mellon University in 1978 to assist in the ordering of Digital Equipment Corporation's (DEC) VAX computer systems by automatically selecting the computer system components based on the customer's requirements.

== Overview ==
In developing the system, McDermott made use of experts from both DEC's PDP/11 and VAX computer systems groups. These experts sometimes even disagreed amongst themselves as to an optimal configuration. The resultant "sorting it out" had an additional benefit in terms of the quality of VAX systems delivered.

XCON first went into use in 1980 in DEC's plant in Salem, New Hampshire, US. It eventually had about 2500 rules. By 1986, it had processed 80,000 orders, and achieved 95–98% accuracy. It was estimated to be saving DEC $25M a year by reducing the need to give customers free components when technicians made errors, by speeding the assembly process, and by increasing customer satisfaction.

Before XCON, when ordering a VAX from DEC, every cable, connection, and bit of software had to be ordered separately. (Computers and peripherals were not sold complete in boxes as they are today.) The sales people were not always very technically expert, so customers would find that they had hardware without the correct cables, printers without the correct drivers, a processor without the correct language chip, and so on. This meant delays and caused a lot of customer dissatisfaction and resultant legal action. XCON interacted with the sales person, asking critical questions before printing out a coherent and workable system specification/order slip.

XCON's success led DEC to rewrite XCON as XSEL—a version of XCON intended for use by DEC's salesforce to aid a customer in properly configuring their VAX (so they would not, say, choose a computer too large to fit through their doorway or choose too few cabinets for the components to fit in). Location problems and configuration were handled by yet another expert system, XSITE.

McDermott's 1980 paper on R1 won the Association for the Advancement of Artificial Intelligence (AAAI) Classic Paper Award in 1999. Footnote 2 gave a humorous explanation for the name "R1" as "Four years ago I couldn't even say "knowledge engineer", now I ... [are one.]".

== Legacy ==
By 1987, XCON had grown to 6200 rules and had become difficult to maintain: "the problems of continually updating such a large system do not grow linearly; moving from 700 rules to 6,200 rules, with 50% of the rules changing every year, makes for an exceedingly difficult software enhancement problem."

In 1989, Digital was using multiple rule-based systems for system configuration, with XCON alone including 10,129 rules. It was saving Digital "tens of millions of dollars each year".

XCON was discontinued in the early 1990s.

== See also ==
- MYCIN
