= Martijn Bolkestein =

Dutch politician (born 1972)

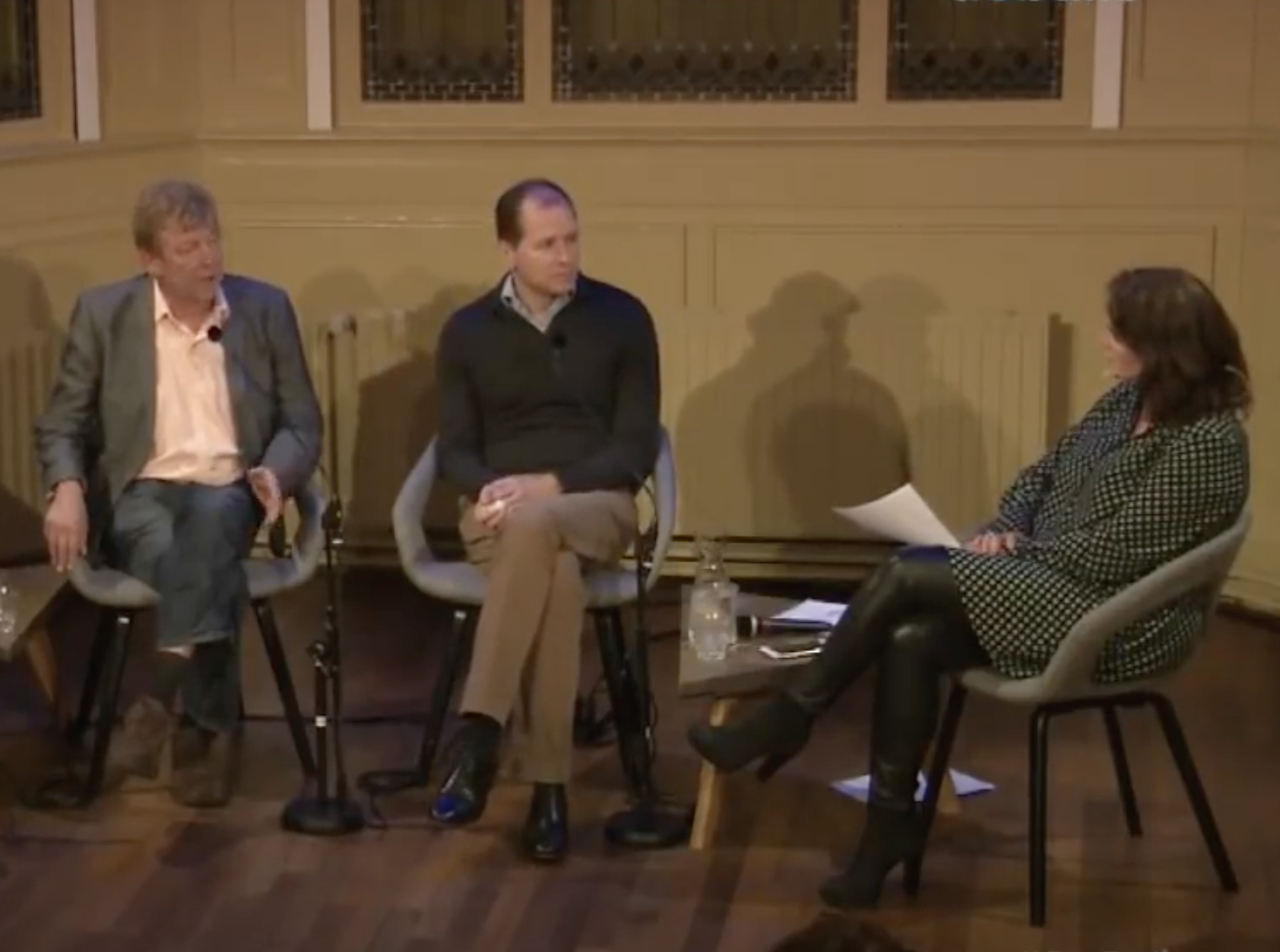
- Bolkestein (centre) during a panel discussion in 2018

Member of the House of Representatives
- In office 2 July 2020 – 30 March 2021
- Preceded by: Bas van 't Wout

Member of the States of North Holland
- In office 17 June 2019 – 14 September 2020
- Succeeded by: Nick Roosendaal

Member of the municipal council of Bloemendaal
- In office 27 March 2014 – 28 March 2018

Personal details
- Born: Martijn N. Bolkestein; 13 March 1972 (age 54) Haarlem, Netherlands
- Party: People's Party for Freedom and Democracy
- Children: 3
- Relatives: Frits Bolkestein (uncle)
- Education: Vrije Universiteit Amsterdam

Martijn N. Bolkestein (born 13 March 1972) is a Dutch politician who served as a member of the House of Representatives between July 2020 and March 2021. He is a member of the People's Party for Freedom and Democracy (VVD).

Prior to becoming a member of the House of Representatives, Bolkestein had a career in the private sector at Royal Dutch Shell and a number of consultancy firms. He had also been a municipal councillor in Bloemendaal (2014–2018) and a member of the States of North Holland (2019–2020).

== Early life and education ==
Bolkestein was born on 13 March 1972 in the North Holland city Haarlem and grew up in the nearby villages Overveen and Bloemendaal. He attended the Stedelijk Gymnasium Haarlem before studying economics at the Vrije Universiteit Amsterdam between 1990 and 1997. During the last one and a half years of his study, he worked as financial manager at Russia Travel.

== Non-political career ==
After completing his study, Bolkestein started working for oil and gas company Royal Dutch Shell in The Hague. His positions included financial and IT manager, and he worked for five years in Dubai for Shell Middle East (2006–2011). In 2012, Bolkestein became an ethics and compliance manager at Shell. Simultaneously, he became a partner at the consultancy firms N=2 Advisory and BlueSuit. The former company advises governments on mergers and divestments, while the latter gives advice on corporate finance to the private sector. Bolkestein left Shell in 2015 after having worked at the company for eighteen years.

Bolkestein worked as managing consultant at the firm Berenschot between April 2017 and his appointment as member of parliament. He returned after his membership had ended.

== Local and regional politics ==
Bolkestein became member of the Bloemendaal municipal council in March 2014 after the VVD received a plurality of five out of nineteen seats in the elections. Bolkestein was placed third on the party list. He succeeded Peter Boeijink as party leader in Bloemendaal in January 2015. He did not run for re-election during the 2018 municipal elections. While a council member, Bolkestein had been on the territory and audit committees.

He also wrote a book in that period called Dorpspolitiek: waar is het lokale gezag? ("Village politics: where is the local authority?") together with political scientist and fellow councilman Meindert Fennema. It was published by Uitgeverij Prometheus in February 2018 and describes the political turmoil in Bloemendaal and the problems local government is facing in general. The book also contains recommendations to bridge the gap between citizens and politics including basing the number of council members that are elected in an election on voter turnout and filling the remaining seats with inhabitants chosen through a lottery.

Bolkestein appeared at place eleven on the party list of the VVD in North Holland during the 2019 provincial elections, but he was not elected. When two members of the States of North Holland belonging to the VVD became members of the new provincial-executive, Bolkestein was appointed to the former body in June 2019. He was made member of the nature, agriculture, and health care committee as well as the VVD's spokesperson in the areas of livability and health care (environment), recreation and tourism, and animal welfare. He left the states-provincial in September 2020 after he had become a member of parliament.

Following municipal elections held on 16 March 2022, Bolkestein was selected as informateur to help form a governing coalition in Wassenaar. He advised the cooperation of the VVD, GroenLinks, and the local parties Hart voor Wassenaar and Lokaal Wassenaar in early May. He subsequently stayed on as formateur until a coalition agreement between those parties was signed on 25 June.

== House of Representatives (2020–2021) ==
During the 2017 general election, Bolkestein was the fiftieth candidate on the VVD's party list. He did not become a member of parliament, as his party won 33 seats and Bolkestein received 735 preferential votes. He joined the House of Representatives on 2 July 2020 because of his place on the party list after Bas van 't Wout had vacated his seat to become State Secretary for Social Affairs and Employment. Frits Bolkestein was present during his swearing in. Within his party, Bolkestein's specialization was health care prevention and enforcement of laws surrounding prostitution and human trafficking. Besides, he was a permanent member of the Committee for Justice and Security.

He did not appear on the party list for the 2021 general election, causing his term to end on 31 March.

== Personal life ==
Bolkestein is married and has three children. He resided in Haarlem while an MP and had lived in the village Aerdenhout before. He is a nephew of politician Frits Bolkestein.
