= Computerized Systems Used In Clinical Trials =

Computerized Systems Used In Clinical Trials (CSUCT) is a guidance document established by the U.S. Food and Drug Administration in 1999 and revised in 2007. It is legally binding in the United States.
