= Aidoc =

Israeli medical technology company

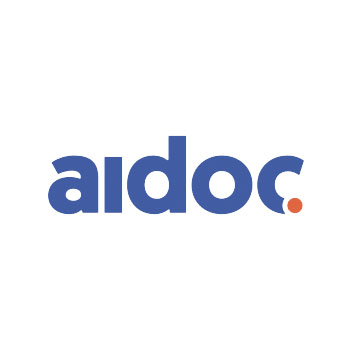
- Industry: Medical technology
- Founded: 2016
- Founders: Elad Walach; Michael Braginsky; Guy Reiner
- Headquarters: Tel Aviv, Israel
- Website: www.aidoc.com

Aidoc Medical is an Israeli technology company that develops computer-aided simple triage and notification systems. Aidoc has obtained U.S. Food and Drug Administration and CE mark approval for its stroke, pulmonary embolism, cervical fracture, intracranial hemorrhage, intra-abdominal free gas, and incidental pulmonary embolism algorithms.

Aidoc algorithms are in use in more than 900 hospitals and imaging centers, including Montefiore Nyack Hospital, LifeBridge Health, LucidHealth, Yale New Haven Hospital, Cedars-Sinai Medical Center, University of Rochester Medical Center, and Sheba Medical Center.

== History ==
Aidoc was founded in 2016 by Elad Walach as the CEO, Michael Braginsky as the CTO and Guy Reiner as the VP. In April 2017, the company raised $7M, led by TLV Partners, and in April 2019, the company raised another $27M, led by Square Peg capital. There have been several additional rounds of funding as well, bringing Aidoc's total investment to $370M as of July 2025.

In August 2018, Aidoc gained FDA clearance for its intracranial hemorrhage system, and in May 2019 it received clearance for the pulmonary embolism system.

In January 2020, the system for detecting large-vessel occlusions (LVOs) in head CTA examinations obtained FDA clearance.

In October 2024, it was reported that Aidoc is working with NVIDIA to develop a framework for deployment and integration of artificial intelligence tools in healthcare. The Blueprint for Resilient Integration and Deployment of Guided Excellence (BRIDGE) is a guideline to facilitate AI adoption in the healthcare industry.

== Products and market ==
Aidoc has developed a suite of artificial intelligence products that flag both time-sensitive and time-consuming (for the radiologist) abnormalities across the body. The algorithms are developed with large quantities of data to provide diagnostic aid for a broad set of pathologies. The company offers an array of algorithms that span across the body, including for intracranial hemorrhage, spine fractures (C, T & L), free air in the abdomen, pulmonary embolism, and more. It developed "Always-on AI", a term coined by Elad Walach that refers to a type of artificial intelligence that is "Always-on—constantly running in the background and automatically analyzing medical imaging data, identifying urgent findings, and sparing radiologists from "drowning" in vast amounts of irrelevant data.

Aidoc's solutions cover medical conditions prevalent in all settings (ED/inpatient/outpatient), including level 1 trauma centers, outpatient imaging centers, teleradiology groups and, are set up in over 200 medical centers worldwide. Notable customers include the University of Rochester Medical Center and Global Diagnostics Australia.

Aidoc announced in 2024 that its new Clinical AI Reasoning Engine (CARE1) had been submitted for FDA approval. In September 2025, Aidoc received a "Breakthrough Device Designation" from the FDA for a new multi-triage solution that spans numerous acute findings in CT scans. Aidoc's CARE1 foundation model was the basis of the workflow on which the designation was made, enabling simultaneous coverage of multiple pathologies. This new designation allows parallel FDA review of multiple indications under a single submission.

In April 2026, Aidoc raised million in a Series E funding round led by Growth Equity at Goldman Sachs Alternatives, with participation from General Catalyst and NVentures. The financing brought the company's total funding to over million.

== Clinical Research ==
A clinical study on Aidoc’ accuracy of deep convolutional neural networks for the detection of pulmonary embolism (PE) on CT pulmonary angiograms (CTPAs) was performed by the University Hospital of Basel and presented at the European Congress of Radiology, showing that the Aidoc algorithm reached 93% sensitivity and 95% specificity. Clinical research has also been performed to test the diagnostic performance of Aidoc's deep learning-based triage system for the flagging of acute findings in abdominal computed tomography (CT) examinations. Overall, the algorithm achieved 93% sensitivity (91/98, 7 false negatives) and 97% specificity (93/96, 3 false-positive) in the detection of acute abdominal findings.

Additional clinical research on Aidoc's Intracranial hemorrhage algorithm accuracy was presented at the European Congress of Radiology by Antwerp University Hospital, evaluating the use of its deep learning algorithm for the detection of intracranial hemorrhage on non-contrast enhanced CT of the brain. The University of Washington completed a study on the accuracy of Aidoc's intracranial hemorrhage algorithm.

== See also ==
- Raidium
