= Symbolic artificial intelligence =

Methods in artificial intelligence research

In artificial intelligence (AI), symbolic artificial intelligence (also known as classical artificial intelligence or logic-based artificial intelligence) is a collection of methods based on high-level symbolic (human-readable) representations of problems, logic, and search. Symbolic AI used tools such as logic programming, production rules, semantic nets and frames. It developed applications such as knowledge-based systems (in particular, expert systems), symbolic mathematics, automated theorem provers, ontologies, the semantic web, and automated planning and scheduling systems. The symbolic AI paradigm led to important ideas in search, symbolic programming languages, agents, multi-agent systems, the semantic web, and the strengths and limitations of formal knowledge and reasoning systems.

Symbolic AI was the dominant paradigm of AI research from the mid-1950s until the mid-1990s. Researchers in the 1960s and the 1970s were convinced that symbolic approaches would eventually succeed in creating a machine with artificial general intelligence and considered this the ultimate goal of their field. An early boom, with early successes such as the Logic Theorist and Samuel's Checkers Playing Program, led to unrealistic expectations and promises and was followed by the first AI Winter as funding dried up. A second boom (1969–1986) occurred with the rise of expert systems, their promise of capturing corporate expertise, and an enthusiastic corporate embrace. That boom, and some early successes, e.g., with XCON at DEC, was followed again by later disappointment. Problems with difficulties in knowledge acquisition, maintaining large knowledge bases, and brittleness in handling out-of-domain problems arose. Another, second, AI Winter (1988–2011) followed. Subsequently, AI researchers focused on addressing underlying problems in handling uncertainty and in knowledge acquisition. Uncertainty was addressed with formal methods such as hidden Markov models, Bayesian reasoning, and statistical relational learning. Symbolic machine learning addressed the knowledge acquisition problem with contributions including Version Space, Valiant's PAC learning, Quinlan's ID3 decision-tree learning, case-based learning, and inductive logic programming to learn relations.

Neural networks, a subsymbolic approach, had been pursued from early days and reemerged strongly in 2012. Early examples are Rosenblatt's perceptron learning work, the backpropagation work of Rumelhart, Hinton and Williams, and work in convolutional neural networks by LeCun et al. in 1989. However, neural networks were not viewed as successful until about 2012: "Until Big Data became commonplace, the general consensus in the Al community was that the so-called neural-network approach was hopeless. Systems just didn't work that well, compared to other methods. ... A revolution came in 2012, when a number of people, including a team of researchers working with Hinton, worked out a way to use the power of GPUs to enormously increase the power of neural networks." Over the next several years, deep learning had spectacular success in handling vision, speech recognition, speech synthesis, image generation, and machine translation, though symbolic approaches continue to be useful in a few domains such as computer algebra systems and proof assistants.

== History ==
A short history of symbolic AI to the present day follows below. Time periods and titles are drawn from Henry Kautz's 2020 AAAI Robert S. Engelmore Memorial Lecture and the longer Wikipedia article on the History of AI, with dates and titles differing slightly for increased clarity.

=== The first AI summer: irrational exuberance, 1948–1966 ===
Success at early attempts in AI occurred in three main areas: artificial neural networks, knowledge representation, and heuristic search, contributing to high expectations. This section summarizes Kautz's reprise of early AI history.

==== Approaches inspired by human or animal cognition or behavior ====
Cybernetic approaches attempted to replicate the feedback loops between animals and their environments. A robotic turtle, with sensors, motors for driving and steering, and seven vacuum tubes for control, based on a preprogrammed neural net, was built as early as 1948. This work can be seen as an early precursor to later work in neural networks, reinforcement learning, and situated robotics.

An important early symbolic AI program was the Logic theorist, written by Allen Newell, Herbert Simon and Cliff Shaw in 1955–56, as it was able to prove 38 elementary theorems from Whitehead and Russell's Principia Mathematica. Newell, Simon, and Shaw later generalized this work to create a domain-independent problem solver, GPS (General Problem Solver). GPS solved problems represented with formal operators via state-space search using means-ends analysis.

During the 1960s, symbolic approaches achieved great success at simulating intelligent behavior in structured environments such as game-playing, symbolic mathematics, and theorem-proving. AI research was concentrated in four institutions in the 1960s: Carnegie Mellon University, Stanford, MIT and (later) University of Edinburgh. Each one developed its own style of research. Earlier approaches based on cybernetics or artificial neural networks were abandoned or pushed into the background.

Herbert Simon and Allen Newell studied human problem-solving skills and attempted to formalize them, and their work laid the foundations of the field of artificial intelligence, as well as cognitive science, operations research and management science. Their research team used the results of psychological experiments to develop programs that simulated the techniques that people used to solve problems. This tradition, centered at Carnegie Mellon University would eventually culminate in the development of the Soar architecture in the middle 1980s.

==== Heuristic search ====
In addition to the highly specialized domain-specific kinds of knowledge that we will see later used in expert systems, early symbolic AI researchers discovered another more general application of knowledge. These were called heuristics, rules of thumb that guide a search in promising directions: "How can non-enumerative search be practical when the underlying problem is exponentially hard? The approach advocated by Simon and Newell is to employ heuristics: fast algorithms that may fail on some inputs or output suboptimal solutions." Another important advance was to find a way to apply these heuristics that guarantees a solution will be found, if there is one, not withstanding the occasional fallibility of heuristics: "The A* algorithm provided a general frame for complete and optimal heuristically guided search. A* is used as a subroutine within practically every AI algorithm today but is still no magic bullet; its guarantee of completeness is bought at the cost of worst-case exponential time.

==== Early work on knowledge representation and reasoning ====
Early work covered both applications of formal reasoning emphasizing first-order logic, along with attempts to handle common-sense reasoning in a less formal manner.

===== Modeling formal reasoning with logic: the "neats" =====
Unlike Simon and Newell, John McCarthy felt that machines did not need to simulate the exact mechanisms of human thought, but could instead try to find the essence of abstract reasoning and problem-solving with logic, regardless of whether people used the same algorithms. (Note: McCarthy once said: "This is AI, so we don't care if it's psychologically real". McCarthy reiterated his position in 2006 at the AI@50 conference where he said "Artificial intelligence is not, by definition, simulation of human intelligence". Pamela McCorduck writes that there are "two major branches of artificial intelligence: one aimed at producing intelligent behavior regardless of how it was accomplished, and the other aimed at modeling intelligent processes found in nature, particularly human ones.", Stuart Russell and Peter Norvig wrote "Aeronautical engineering texts do not define the goal of their field as making 'machines that fly so exactly like pigeons that they can fool even other pigeons.'") His laboratory at Stanford (SAIL) focused on using formal logic to solve a wide variety of problems, including knowledge representation, planning and learning. Logic was also the focus of the work at the University of Edinburgh and elsewhere in Europe which led to the development of the programming language Prolog and the science of logic programming.

===== Modeling implicit common-sense knowledge with frames and scripts: the "scruffies" =====
Researchers at MIT (such as Marvin Minsky and Seymour Papert) found that solving difficult problems in vision and natural language processing required ad hoc solutions—they argued that no simple and general principle (like logic) would capture all the aspects of intelligent behavior. Roger Schank described their "anti-logic" approaches as "scruffy" (as opposed to the "neat" paradigms at CMU and Stanford). Commonsense knowledge bases (such as Doug Lenat's Cyc) are an example of "scruffy" AI, since they must be built by hand, one complicated concept at a time.

=== The first AI winter: crushed dreams, 1967–1977 ===
The first AI winter was a shock:

During the first AI summer, many people thought that machine intelligence could be achieved in just a few years. The Defense Advance Research Projects Agency (DARPA) launched programs to support AI research to use AI to solve problems of national security; in particular, to automate the translation of Russian to English for intelligence operations and to create autonomous tanks for the battlefield. Researchers had begun to realize that achieving AI was going to be much harder than was supposed a decade earlier, but a combination of hubris and disingenuousness led many university and think-tank researchers to accept funding with promises of deliverables that they should have known they could not fulfill. By the mid-1960s neither useful natural language translation systems nor autonomous tanks had been created, and a dramatic backlash set in. New DARPA leadership canceled existing AI funding programs.

...

Outside of the United States, the most fertile ground for AI research was the United Kingdom. The AI winter in the United Kingdom was spurred on not so much by disappointed military leaders as by rival academics who viewed AI researchers as charlatans and a drain on research funding. A professor of applied mathematics, Sir James Lighthill, was commissioned by Parliament to evaluate the state of AI research in the nation. The report stated that all of the problems being worked on in AI would be better handled by researchers from other disciplines—such as applied mathematics. The report also claimed that AI successes on toy problems could never scale to real-world applications due to combinatorial explosion.

=== The second AI summer: knowledge is power, 1978–1987 ===
==== Knowledge-based systems ====
As limitations with weak, domain-independent methods became more and more apparent, researchers from all three traditions began to build knowledge into AI applications. The knowledge revolution was driven by the realization that knowledge underlies high-performance, domain-specific AI applications.

Edward Feigenbaum said:

- "In the knowledge lies the power."

to describe that high performance in a specific domain requires both general and highly domain-specific knowledge. Ed Feigenbaum and Doug Lenat called this The Knowledge Principle:

(1) The Knowledge Principle: if a program is to perform a complex task well, it must know a great deal about the world in which it operates.
(2) A plausible extension of that principle, called the Breadth Hypothesis: there are two additional abilities necessary for intelligent behavior in unexpected situations: falling back on increasingly general knowledge, and analogizing to specific but far-flung knowledge.

==== Success with expert systems ====
This "knowledge revolution" led to the development and deployment of expert systems (introduced by Edward Feigenbaum), the first commercially successful form of AI software.

Key expert systems were:

- DENDRAL, which found the structure of organic molecules from their chemical formula and mass spectrometer readings.
- MYCIN, which diagnosed bacteremia – and suggested further lab tests, when necessary – by interpreting lab results, patient history, and doctor observations. "With about 450 rules, MYCIN was able to perform as well as some experts, and considerably better than junior doctors."
- INTERNIST and CADUCEUS which tackled internal medicine diagnosis. Internist attempted to capture the expertise of the chairman of internal medicine at the University of Pittsburgh School of Medicine while CADUCEUS could eventually diagnose up to 1000 different diseases.
- GUIDON, which showed how a knowledge base built for expert problem solving could be repurposed for teaching.
- XCON, to configure VAX computers, a then laborious process that could take up to 90 days. XCON reduced the time to about 90 minutes.

DENDRAL is considered the first expert system that relied on knowledge-intensive problem-solving. It is described below, by Ed Feigenbaum, from a Communications of the ACM interview, Interview with Ed Feigenbaum:

One of the people at Stanford interested in computer-based models of mind was Joshua Lederberg, the 1958 Nobel Prize winner in genetics. When I told him I wanted an induction "sandbox", he said, "I have just the one for you." His lab was doing mass spectrometry of amino acids. The question was: how do you go from looking at the spectrum of an amino acid to the chemical structure of the amino acid? That's how we started the DENDRAL Project: I was good at heuristic search methods, and he had an algorithm that was good at generating the chemical problem space.

We did not have a grandiose vision. We worked bottom up. Our chemist was Carl Djerassi, inventor of the chemical behind the birth control pill, and also one of the world's most respected mass spectrometrists. Carl and his postdocs were world-class experts in mass spectrometry. We began to add to their knowledge, inventing knowledge of engineering as we went along. These experiments amounted to titrating DENDRAL more and more knowledge. The more you did that, the smarter the program became. We had very good results.

The generalization was: in the knowledge lies the power. That was the big idea. In my career that is the huge, "Ah ha!," and it wasn't the way AI was being done previously. Sounds simple, but it's probably AI's most powerful generalization.

The other expert systems mentioned above came after DENDRAL. MYCIN exemplifies the classic expert system architecture of a knowledge-base of rules coupled to a symbolic reasoning mechanism, including the use of certainty factors to handle uncertainty. GUIDON shows how an explicit knowledge base can be repurposed for a second application, tutoring, and is an example of an intelligent tutoring system, a particular kind of knowledge-based application. Clancey showed that it was not sufficient simply to use MYCIN's rules for instruction, but that he also needed to add rules for dialogue management and student modeling. XCON is significant because of the millions of dollars it saved DEC, which triggered the expert system boom where most all major corporations in the US had expert systems groups, to capture corporate expertise, preserve it, and automate it:

By 1988, DEC's AI group had 40 expert systems deployed, with more on the way. DuPont had 100 in use and 500 in development. Nearly every major U.S. corporation had its own Al group and was either using or investigating expert systems.

Chess expert knowledge was encoded in Deep Blue. In 1996, this allowed IBM's Deep Blue, with the help of symbolic AI, to win in a game of chess against the world champion at that time, Garry Kasparov.

===== Architecture of knowledge-based and expert systems =====
A key component of the system architecture for all expert systems is the knowledge base, which stores facts and rules for problem-solving. The simplest approach for an expert system knowledge base is simply a collection or network of production rules. Production rules connect symbols in a relationship similar to an If-Then statement. The expert system processes the rules to make deductions and to determine what additional information it needs, i.e. what questions to ask, using human-readable symbols. For example, OPS5, CLIPS and their successors Jess and Drools operate in this fashion.

Expert systems can operate in either a forward chaining – from evidence to conclusions – or backward chaining – from goals to needed data and prerequisites – manner. More advanced knowledge-based systems, such as Soar can also perform meta-level reasoning, that is reasoning about their own reasoning in terms of deciding how to solve problems and monitoring the success of problem-solving strategies.

Blackboard systems are a second kind of knowledge-based or expert system architecture. They model a community of experts incrementally contributing, where they can, to solve a problem. The problem is represented in multiple levels of abstraction or alternate views. The experts (knowledge sources) volunteer their services whenever they recognize they can contribute. Potential problem-solving actions are represented on an agenda that is updated as the problem situation changes. A controller decides how useful each contribution is, and who should make the next problem-solving action. One example, the BB1 blackboard architecture was originally inspired by studies of how humans plan to perform multiple tasks in a trip. An innovation of BB1 was to apply the same blackboard model to solving its control problem, i.e., its controller performed meta-level reasoning with knowledge sources that monitored how well a plan or the problem-solving was proceeding and could switch from one strategy to another as conditions – such as goals or times – changed. BB1 has been applied in multiple domains: construction site planning, intelligent tutoring systems, and real-time patient monitoring.

=== The second AI winter, 1988–1993 ===
At the height of the AI boom, companies such as Symbolics, LMI, and Texas Instruments were selling LISP machines specifically targeted to accelerate the development of AI applications and research. In addition, several artificial intelligence companies, such as Teknowledge and Inference Corporation, were selling expert system shells, training, and consulting to corporations.

Unfortunately, the AI boom did not last and Kautz best describes the second AI winter that followed:

Many reasons can be offered for the arrival of the second AI winter. The hardware companies failed when much more cost-effective general Unix workstations from Sun together with good compilers for LISP and Prolog came onto the market. Many commercial deployments of expert systems were discontinued when they proved too costly to maintain. Medical expert systems never caught on for several reasons: the difficulty in keeping them up to date; the challenge for medical professionals to learn how to use a bewildering variety of different expert systems for different medical conditions; and perhaps most crucially, the reluctance of doctors to trust a computer-made diagnosis over their gut instinct, even for specific domains where the expert systems could outperform an average doctor. Venture capital money deserted AI practically overnight. The world AI conference IJCAI hosted an enormous and lavish trade show and thousands of nonacademic attendees in 1987 in Vancouver; the main AI conference the following year, AAAI 1988 in St. Paul, was a small and strictly academic affair.

=== Adding in more rigorous foundations, 1993–2011 ===
==== Uncertain reasoning ====
Both statistical approaches and extensions to logic were tried.

One statistical approach, hidden Markov models, had already been popularized in the 1980s for speech recognition work. Subsequently, in 1988, Judea Pearl popularized the use of Bayesian Networks as a sound but efficient way of handling uncertain reasoning with his publication of the book Probabilistic Reasoning in Intelligent Systems: Networks of Plausible Inference. and Bayesian approaches were applied successfully in expert systems. Even later, in the 1990s, statistical relational learning, an approach that combines probability with logical formulas, allowed probability to be combined with first-order logic, e.g., with either Markov Logic Networks or Probabilistic Soft Logic.

Other, non-probabilistic extensions to first-order logic to support were also tried. For example, non-monotonic reasoning could be used with truth maintenance systems. A truth maintenance system tracked assumptions and justifications for all inferences. It allowed inferences to be withdrawn when assumptions were found out to be incorrect or a contradiction was derived. Explanations could be provided for an inference by explaining which rules were applied to create it and then continuing through underlying inferences and rules all the way back to root assumptions. Lotfi Zadeh had introduced a different kind of extension to handle the representation of vagueness. For example, in deciding how "heavy" or "tall" a man is, there is frequently no clear "yes" or "no" answer, and a predicate for heavy or tall would instead return values between 0 and 1. Those values represented to what degree the predicates were true. His fuzzy logic further provided a means for propagating combinations of these values through logical formulas.

==== Machine learning ====
Symbolic machine learning approaches were investigated to address the knowledge acquisition bottleneck. One of the earliest is Meta-DENDRAL. Meta-DENDRAL used a generate-and-test technique to generate plausible rule hypotheses to test against spectra. Domain and task knowledge reduced the number of candidates tested to a manageable size. Feigenbaum described Meta-DENDRAL as

...the culmination of my dream of the early to mid-1960s having to do with theory formation. The conception was that you had a problem solver like DENDRAL that took some inputs and produced an output. In doing so, it used layers of knowledge to steer and prune the search. That knowledge got in there because we interviewed people. But how did the people get the knowledge? By looking at thousands of spectra. So we wanted a program that would look at thousands of spectra and infer the knowledge of mass spectrometry that DENDRAL could use to solve individual hypothesis formation problems. We did it. We were even able to publish new knowledge of mass spectrometry in the Journal of the American Chemical Society, giving credit only in a footnote that a program, Meta-DENDRAL, actually did it. We were able to do something that had been a dream: to have a computer program come up with a new and publishable piece of science.

In contrast to the knowledge-intensive approach of Meta-DENDRAL, Ross Quinlan invented a domain-independent approach to statistical classification, decision tree learning, starting first with ID3 and then later extending its capabilities to C4.5. The decision trees created are glass box, interpretable classifiers, with human-interpretable classification rules.

Advances were made in understanding machine learning theory, too. Tom Mitchell introduced version space learning which describes learning as a search through a space of hypotheses, with upper, more general, and lower, more specific, boundaries encompassing all viable hypotheses consistent with the examples seen so far. More formally, Valiant introduced Probably Approximately Correct Learning (PAC Learning), a framework for the mathematical analysis of machine learning.

Symbolic machine learning encompassed more than learning by example. E.g., John Anderson provided a cognitive model of human learning where skill practice results in a compilation of rules from a declarative format to a procedural format with his ACT-R cognitive architecture. For example, a student might learn to apply "Supplementary angles are two angles whose measures sum 180 degrees" as several different procedural rules. E.g., one rule might say that if X and Y are supplementary and you know X, then Y will be 180 - X. He called his approach "knowledge compilation". ACT-R has been used successfully to model aspects of human cognition, such as learning and retention. ACT-R is also used in intelligent tutoring systems, called cognitive tutors, to successfully teach geometry, computer programming, and algebra to school children.

Inductive logic programming was another approach to learning that allowed logic programs to be synthesized from input-output examples. E.g., Ehud Shapiro's MIS (Model Inference System) could synthesize Prolog programs from examples. John R. Koza applied genetic algorithms to program synthesis to create genetic programming, which he used to synthesize LISP programs. Finally, Zohar Manna and Richard Waldinger provided a more general approach to program synthesis that synthesizes a functional program in the course of proving its specifications to be correct.

As an alternative to logic, Roger Schank introduced case-based reasoning (CBR). The CBR approach outlined in his book, Dynamic Memory, focuses first on remembering key problem-solving cases for future use and generalizing them where appropriate. When faced with a new problem, CBR retrieves the most similar previous case and adapts it to the specifics of the current problem. Another alternative to logic, genetic algorithms and genetic programming are based on an evolutionary model of learning, where sets of rules are encoded into populations, the rules govern the behavior of individuals, and selection of the fittest prunes out sets of unsuitable rules over many generations.

Symbolic machine learning was applied to learning concepts, rules, heuristics, and problem-solving. Approaches, other than those above, include:

1. Learning from instruction or advice—i.e., taking human instruction, posed as advice, and determining how to operationalize it in specific situations. For example, in a game of Hearts, learning exactly how to play a hand to "avoid taking points."
2. Learning from exemplars—improving performance by accepting subject-matter expert (SME) feedback during training. When problem-solving fails, querying the expert to either learn a new exemplar for problem-solving or to learn a new explanation as to exactly why one exemplar is more relevant than another. For example, the program Protos learned to diagnose tinnitus cases by interacting with an audiologist.
3. Learning by analogy—constructing problem solutions based on similar problems seen in the past, and then modifying their solutions to fit a new situation or domain.
4. Apprentice learning systems—learning novel solutions to problems by observing human problem-solving. Domain knowledge explains why novel solutions are correct and how the solution can be generalized. LEAP learned how to design VLSI circuits by observing human designers.
5. Learning by discovery—i.e., creating tasks to carry out experiments and then learning from the results. Doug Lenat's Eurisko, for example, learned heuristics to beat human players at the Traveller role-playing game for two years in a row.
6. Learning macro-operators—i.e., searching for useful macro-operators to be learned from sequences of basic problem-solving actions. Good macro-operators simplify problem-solving by allowing problems to be solved at a more abstract level.

=== Deep learning and neuro-symbolic AI 2011–now ===
With the rise of deep learning, the symbolic AI approach has been compared to deep learning as complementary "...with parallels having been drawn many times by AI researchers between Kahneman's research on human reasoning and decision making – reflected in his book Thinking, Fast and Slow – and the so-called "AI systems 1 and 2", which would in principle be modelled by deep learning and symbolic reasoning, respectively." In this view, symbolic reasoning is more apt for deliberative reasoning, planning, and explanation while deep learning is more apt for fast pattern recognition in perceptual applications with noisy data.

==== Neuro-symbolic AI: integrating neural and symbolic approaches ====
Neuro-symbolic AI attempts to integrate neural and symbolic architectures in a manner that addresses strengths and weaknesses of each, in a complementary fashion, in order to support robust AI capable of reasoning, learning, and cognitive modeling. As argued by Valiant and many others, the effective construction of rich computational cognitive models demands the combination of sound symbolic reasoning and efficient (machine) learning models. Gary Marcus, similarly, argues that: "We cannot construct rich cognitive models in an adequate, automated way without the triumvirate of hybrid architecture, rich prior knowledge, and sophisticated techniques for reasoning.", and in particular: "To build a robust, knowledge-driven approach to AI we must have the machinery of symbol-manipulation in our toolkit. Too much of useful knowledge is abstract to make do without tools that represent and manipulate abstraction, and to date, the only machinery that we know of that can manipulate such abstract knowledge reliably is the apparatus of symbol manipulation."

Henry Kautz, Francesca Rossi, and Bart Selman have also argued for a synthesis. Their arguments are based on a need to address the two kinds of thinking discussed in Daniel Kahneman's book, Thinking, Fast and Slow. Kahneman describes human thinking as having two components, System 1 and System 2. System 1 is fast, automatic, intuitive and unconscious. System 2 is slower, step-by-step, and explicit. System 1 is the kind used for pattern recognition while System 2 is far better suited for planning, deduction, and deliberative thinking. In this view, deep learning best models the first kind of thinking while symbolic reasoning best models the second kind and both are needed.

Garcez and Lamb describe research in this area as being ongoing for at least the past twenty years, dating from their 2002 book on neurosymbolic learning systems. A series of workshops on neuro-symbolic reasoning has been held every year since 2005.

In their 2015 paper, Neural-Symbolic Learning and Reasoning: Contributions and Challenges, Garcez et al. argue that:

The integration of the symbolic and connectionist paradigms of AI has been pursued by a relatively small research community over the last two decades and has yielded several significant results. Over the last decade, neural symbolic systems have been shown capable of overcoming the so-called propositional fixation of neural networks, as McCarthy (1988) put it in response to Smolensky (1988); see also (Hinton, 1990). Neural networks were shown capable of representing modal and temporal logics (d'Avila Garcez and Lamb, 2006) and fragments of first-order logic (Bader, Hitzler, Hölldobler, 2008; d'Avila Garcez, Lamb, Gabbay, 2009). Further, neural-symbolic systems have been applied to a number of problems in the areas of bioinformatics, control engineering, software verification and adaptation, visual intelligence, ontology learning, and computer games.

Approaches for integration are varied. Henry Kautz's taxonomy of neuro-symbolic architectures, along with some examples, follows:

- Symbolic Neural symbolic—is the current approach of many neural models in natural language processing, where words or subword tokens are both the ultimate input and output of large language models. Examples include BERT, RoBERTa, and GPT-3.
- Symbolic[Neural]—is exemplified by AlphaGo, where symbolic techniques are used to call neural techniques. In this case the symbolic approach is Monte Carlo tree search and the neural techniques learn how to evaluate game positions.
- Neural|Symbolic—uses a neural architecture to interpret perceptual data as symbols and relationships that are then reasoned about symbolically.
- Neural:Symbolic → Neural—relies on symbolic reasoning to generate or label training data that is subsequently learned by a deep learning model, e.g., to train a neural model for symbolic computation by using a Macsyma-like symbolic mathematics system to create or label examples.
- Neural_{Symbolic}—uses a neural net that is generated from symbolic rules. An example is the Neural Theorem Prover, which constructs a neural network from an AND–OR proof tree generated from knowledge base rules and terms. Logic Tensor Networks also fall into this category.
- Neural[Symbolic]—allows a neural model to directly call a symbolic reasoning engine, e.g., to perform an action or evaluate a state.

Many key research questions remain, such as:

- What is the best way to integrate neural and symbolic architectures?
- How should symbolic structures be represented within neural networks and extracted from them?
- How should common-sense knowledge be learned and reasoned about?
- How can abstract knowledge that is hard to encode logically be handled?

== Techniques and contributions ==
This section provides an overview of techniques and contributions in an overall context leading to many other, more detailed articles in Wikipedia. Sections on Machine Learning and Uncertain Reasoning are covered earlier in the history section.

=== AI programming languages ===
The key AI programming language in the US during the last symbolic AI boom period was LISP. LISP is the second oldest programming language after FORTRAN and was created in 1958 by John McCarthy. LISP provided the first read–eval–print loop to support rapid program development. Compiled functions could be freely mixed with interpreted functions. Program tracing, stepping, and breakpoints were also provided, along with the ability to change values or functions and continue from breakpoints or errors. It had the first self-hosting compiler, meaning that the compiler itself was originally written in LISP and then ran interpretively to compile the compiler code.

Other key innovations pioneered by LISP that have spread to other programming languages include:

- Garbage collection
- Dynamic typing
- Higher-order functions
- Recursion
- Conditionals

Programs were themselves data structures that other programs could operate on, allowing the easy definition of higher-level languages.

In contrast to the US, in Europe the key AI programming language during that same period was Prolog. Prolog provided a built-in store of facts and clauses that could be queried by a read–eval–print loop. The store could act as a knowledge base and the clauses could act as rules or a restricted form of logic. As a subset of first-order logic Prolog was based on Horn clauses with a closed-world assumption—any facts not known were considered false—and a unique name assumption for primitive terms—e.g., the identifier barack_obama was considered to refer to exactly one object. Backtracking and unification are built-in to Prolog.

Alain Colmerauer and Philippe Roussel are credited as the inventors of Prolog. Prolog is a form of logic programming, which was invented by Robert Kowalski. Its history was also influenced by Carl Hewitt's PLANNER, an assertional database with pattern-directed invocation of methods. For more detail see the section on the origins of Prolog in the PLANNER article.

Prolog is also a kind of declarative programming. The logic clauses that describe programs are directly interpreted to run the programs specified. No explicit series of actions is required, as is the case with imperative programming languages.

Japan championed Prolog for its Fifth Generation Project, intending to build special hardware for high performance. Similarly, LISP machines were built to run LISP, but as the second AI boom turned to bust these companies could not compete with new workstations that could now run LISP or Prolog natively at comparable speeds. See the history section for more detail.

Smalltalk was another influential AI programming language. For example, it introduced metaclasses and, along with Flavors and CommonLoops, influenced the Common Lisp Object System, or (CLOS), that is now part of Common Lisp, the current standard Lisp dialect. CLOS is a Lisp-based object-oriented system that allows multiple inheritance, in addition to incremental extensions to both classes and metaclasses, thus providing a run-time meta-object protocol.

For other AI programming languages see this list of programming languages for artificial intelligence. Currently, Python, a multi-paradigm programming language, is the most popular programming language, partly due to its extensive package library that supports data science, natural language processing, and deep learning. Python includes a read-eval-print loop, functional elements such as higher-order functions, and object-oriented programming that includes metaclasses.

=== Search ===
Search arises in many kinds of problem solving, including planning, constraint satisfaction, and playing games such as checkers, chess, and go. The best known AI-search tree search algorithms are breadth-first search, depth-first search, A*, and Monte Carlo Search. Key search algorithms for Boolean satisfiability are WalkSAT, conflict-driven clause learning, and the DPLL algorithm. For adversarial search when playing games, alpha-beta pruning, branch and bound, and minimax were early contributions.

=== Knowledge representation and reasoning ===
Multiple different approaches to represent knowledge and then reason with those representations have been investigated. Below is a quick overview of approaches to knowledge representation and automated reasoning.

==== Knowledge representation ====
Semantic networks, conceptual graphs, frames, and logic are all approaches to modeling knowledge such as domain knowledge, problem-solving knowledge, and the semantic meaning of language. Ontologies model key concepts and their relationships in a domain. Example ontologies are YAGO, WordNet, and DOLCE. DOLCE is an example of an upper ontology that can be used for any domain while WordNet is a lexical resource that can also be viewed as an ontology. YAGO incorporates WordNet as part of its ontology, to align facts extracted from Wikipedia with WordNet synsets. The Disease Ontology is an example of a medical ontology currently being used.

Description logic is a logic for automated classification of ontologies and for detecting inconsistent classification data. OWL is a language used to represent ontologies with description logic. Protégé is an ontology editor that can read in OWL ontologies and then check consistency with deductive classifiers such as such as HermiT.

First-order logic is more general than description logic. The automated theorem provers discussed below can prove theorems in first-order logic. Horn clause logic is more restricted than first-order logic and is used in logic programming languages such as Prolog. Extensions to first-order logic include temporal logic, to handle time; epistemic logic, to reason about agent knowledge; modal logic, to handle possibility and necessity; and probabilistic logics to handle logic and probability together.

==== Automatic theorem proving ====
Examples of automated theorem provers for first-order logic are:

- Prover9
- ACL2
- Vampire

Prover9 can be used in conjunction with the Mace4 model checker. ACL2 is a theorem prover that can handle proofs by induction and is a descendant of the Boyer-Moore Theorem Prover, also known as Nqthm.

==== Reasoning in knowledge-based systems ====
Knowledge-based systems have an explicit knowledge base, typically of rules, to enhance reusability across domains by separating procedural code and domain knowledge. A separate inference engine processes rules and adds, deletes, or modifies a knowledge store.

Forward chaining inference engines are the most common, and are seen in CLIPS and OPS5. Backward chaining occurs in Prolog, where a more limited logical representation is used, Horn Clauses. Pattern-matching, specifically unification, is used in Prolog.

A more flexible kind of problem-solving occurs when reasoning about what to do next occurs, rather than simply choosing one of the available actions. This kind of meta-level reasoning is used in Soar and in the BB1 blackboard architecture.

Cognitive architectures such as ACT-R may have additional capabilities, such as the ability to compile frequently used knowledge into higher-level chunks.

==== Commonsense reasoning ====
Marvin Minsky first proposed frames as a way of interpreting common visual situations, such as an office, and Roger Schank extended this idea to scripts for common routines, such as dining out. Cyc has attempted to capture useful common-sense knowledge and has "micro-theories" to handle particular kinds of domain-specific reasoning.

Qualitative simulation, such as Benjamin Kuipers's QSIM, approximates human reasoning about naive physics, such as what happens when we heat a liquid in a pot on the stove. We expect it to heat and possibly boil over, even though we may not know its temperature, its boiling point, or other details, such as atmospheric pressure.

Similarly, Allen's temporal interval algebra is a simplification of reasoning about time and Region Connection Calculus is a simplification of reasoning about spatial relationships. Both can be solved with constraint solvers.

==== Constraints and constraint-based reasoning ====
Constraint solvers perform a more limited kind of inference than first-order logic. They can simplify sets of spatiotemporal constraints, such as those for RCC or Temporal Algebra, along with solving other kinds of puzzle problems, such as Wordle, Sudoku, cryptarithmetic problems, and so on. Constraint logic programming can be used to solve scheduling problems, for example with constraint handling rules (CHR).

=== Automated planning ===
The General Problem Solver (GPS) cast planning as problem-solving used means-ends analysis to create plans. STRIPS took a different approach, viewing planning as theorem proving. Graphplan takes a least-commitment approach to planning, rather than sequentially choosing actions from an initial state, working forwards, or a goal state if working backwards. Satplan is an approach to planning where a planning problem is reduced to a Boolean satisfiability problem.

=== Natural language processing ===
Natural language processing focuses on treating language as data to perform tasks such as identifying topics without necessarily understanding the intended meaning. Natural language understanding, in contrast, constructs a meaning representation and uses that for further processing, such as answering questions.

Parsing, tokenizing, spelling correction, part-of-speech tagging, noun and verb phrase chunking are all aspects of natural language processing long handled by symbolic AI, but since improved by deep learning approaches. In symbolic AI, discourse representation theory and first-order logic have been used to represent sentence meanings. Latent semantic analysis (LSA) and explicit semantic analysis also provided vector representations of documents. In the latter case, vector components are interpretable as concepts named by Wikipedia articles.

New deep learning approaches based on Transformer models have now eclipsed these earlier symbolic AI approaches and attained state-of-the-art performance in natural language processing. However, Transformer models are opaque and do not yet produce human-interpretable semantic representations for sentences and documents. Instead, they produce task-specific vectors where the meaning of the vector components is opaque.

=== Agents and multi-agent systems ===
Agents are autonomous systems embedded in an environment they perceive and act upon in some sense. Russell and Norvig's standard textbook on artificial intelligence is organized to reflect agent architectures of increasing sophistication. The sophistication of agents varies from simple reactive agents, to those with a model of the world and automated planning capabilities, possibly a BDI agent, i.e., one with beliefs, desires, and intentions – or alternatively a reinforcement learning model learned over time to choose actions – up to a combination of alternative architectures, such as a neuro-symbolic architecture that includes deep learning for perception.

In contrast, a multi-agent system consists of multiple agents that communicate amongst themselves with some inter-agent communication language such as Knowledge Query and Manipulation Language (KQML). The agents need not all have the same internal architecture. Advantages of multi-agent systems include the ability to divide work among the agents and to increase fault tolerance when agents are lost. Research problems include how agents reach consensus, distributed problem solving, multi-agent learning, multi-agent planning, and distributed constraint optimization.

== Controversies ==
Controversies arose from early on in symbolic AI, both within the field—e.g., between logicists (the pro-logic "neats") and non-logicists (the anti-logic "scruffies")—and between those who embraced AI but rejected symbolic approaches—primarily connectionists—and those outside the field. Critiques from outside of the field were primarily from philosophers, on intellectual grounds, but also from funding agencies, especially during the two AI winters.

=== The Frame Problem: knowledge representation challenges for first-order logic ===
Limitations were discovered in using simple first-order logic to reason about dynamic domains. Problems were discovered both with regards to enumerating the preconditions for an action to succeed and in providing axioms for what did not change after an action was performed.

McCarthy and Hayes introduced the Frame Problem in 1969 in the paper, "Some Philosophical Problems from the Standpoint of Artificial Intelligence." A simple example occurs in "proving that one person could get into conversation with another", as an axiom asserting "if a person has a telephone he still has it after looking up a number in the telephone book" would be required for the deduction to succeed. Similar axioms would be required for other domain actions to specify what did not change.

A similar problem, called the Qualification Problem, occurs in trying to enumerate the preconditions for an action to succeed. An infinite number of pathological conditions can be imagined, e.g., a banana in a tailpipe could prevent a car from operating correctly.

McCarthy's approach to fix the frame problem was circumscription, a kind of non-monotonic logic where deductions could be made from actions that need only specify what would change while not having to explicitly specify everything that would not change. Other non-monotonic logics provided truth maintenance systems that revised beliefs leading to contradictions.

Other ways of handling more open-ended domains included probabilistic reasoning systems and machine learning to learn new concepts and rules. McCarthy's Advice Taker can be viewed as an inspiration here, as it could incorporate new knowledge provided by a human in the form of assertions or rules. For example, experimental symbolic machine learning systems explored the ability to take high-level natural language advice and to interpret it into domain-specific actionable rules.

Similar to the problems in handling dynamic domains, common-sense reasoning is also difficult to capture in formal reasoning. Examples of common-sense reasoning include implicit reasoning about how people think or general knowledge of day-to-day events, objects, and living creatures. This kind of knowledge is taken for granted and not viewed as noteworthy. Common-sense reasoning is an open area of research and challenging both for symbolic systems (e.g., Cyc has attempted to capture key parts of this knowledge over more than a decade) and neural systems (e.g., self-driving cars that do not know not to drive into cones or not to hit pedestrians walking a bicycle).

McCarthy viewed his Advice Taker as having common-sense, but his definition of common-sense was different than the one above. He defined a program as having common sense "if it automatically deduces for itself a sufficiently wide class of immediate consequences of anything it is told and what it already knows."

=== Connectionist AI: philosophical challenges and sociological conflicts ===
Connectionist approaches include earlier work on neural networks, such as perceptrons; work in the mid to late 80s, such as Danny Hillis's Connection Machine and Yann LeCun's advances in convolutional neural networks; to today's more advanced approaches, such as Transformers, GANs, and other work in deep learning.

Three philosophical positions have been outlined among connectionists:

1. Implementationism—where connectionist architectures implement the capabilities for symbolic processing,
2. Radical connectionism—where symbolic processing is rejected totally, and connectionist architectures underlie intelligence and are fully sufficient to explain it,
3. Moderate connectionism—where symbolic processing and connectionist architectures are viewed as complementary and both are required for intelligence.

Olazaran, in his sociological history of the controversies within the neural network community, described the moderate connectionism view as essentially compatible with current research in neuro-symbolic hybrids:

The third and last position I would like to examine here is what I call the moderate connectionist view, a more eclectic view of the current debate between connectionism and symbolic AI. One of the researchers who has elaborated this position most explicitly is Andy Clark, a philosopher from the School of Cognitive and Computing Sciences of the University of Sussex (Brighton, England). Clark defended hybrid (partly symbolic, partly connectionist) systems. He claimed that (at least) two kinds of theories are needed in order to study and model cognition. On the one hand, for some information-processing tasks (such as pattern recognition) connectionism has advantages over symbolic models. But on the other hand, for other cognitive processes (such as serial, deductive reasoning, and generative symbol manipulation processes) the symbolic paradigm offers adequate models, and not only "approximations" (contrary to what radical connectionists would claim).

Gary Marcus has claimed that the animus in the deep learning community against symbolic approaches now may be more sociological than philosophical:

To think that we can simply abandon symbol-manipulation is to suspend disbelief.

And yet, for the most part, that's how most current AI proceeds. Hinton and many others have tried hard to banish symbols altogether. The deep learning hope—seemingly grounded not so much in science, but in a sort of historical grudge—is that intelligent behavior will emerge purely from the confluence of massive data and deep learning. Where classical computers and software solve tasks by defining sets of symbol-manipulating rules dedicated to particular jobs, such as editing a line in a word processor or performing a calculation in a spreadsheet, neural networks typically try to solve tasks by statistical approximation and learning from examples.

According to Marcus, Geoffrey Hinton and his colleagues have been vehemently "anti-symbolic":

When deep learning reemerged in 2012, it was with a kind of take-no-prisoners attitude that has characterized most of the last decade. By 2015, his hostility toward all things symbols had fully crystallized. He gave a talk at an AI workshop at Stanford comparing symbols to aether, one of science's greatest mistakes.

...

Since then, his anti-symbolic campaign has only increased in intensity. In 2016, Yann LeCun, Bengio, and Hinton wrote a manifesto for deep learning in one of science's most important journals, Nature. It closed with a direct attack on symbol manipulation, calling not for reconciliation but for outright replacement. Later, Hinton told a gathering of European Union leaders that investing any further money in symbol-manipulating approaches was "a huge mistake," likening it to investing in internal combustion engines in the era of electric cars.

Part of these disputes may be due to unclear terminology:

Turing award winner Judea Pearl offers a critique of machine learning which, unfortunately, conflates the terms machine learning and deep learning. Similarly, when Geoffrey Hinton refers to symbolic AI, the connotation of the term tends to be that of expert systems dispossessed of any ability to learn. The use of the terminology is in need of clarification. Machine learning is not confined to association rule mining, c.f. the body of work on symbolic ML and relational learning (the differences to deep learning being the choice of representation, localist logical rather than distributed, and the non-use of gradient-based learning algorithms). Equally, symbolic AI is not just about production rules written by hand. A proper definition of AI concerns knowledge representation and reasoning, autonomous multi-agent systems, planning and argumentation, as well as learning.

It is worth noting that, from a theoretical perspective, the boundary of advantages between connectionist AI and symbolic AI may not be as clear-cut as it appears. For instance, Heng Zhang and his colleagues have proved that mainstream knowledge representation formalisms are recursively isomorphic, provided they are universal or have equivalent expressive power. This finding implies that there is no fundamental distinction between using symbolic or connectionist knowledge representation formalisms for the realization of artificial general intelligence (AGI). Moreover, the existence of recursive isomorphisms suggests that different technical approaches can draw insights from one another. From this perspective, it seems unnecessary to overemphasize the advantages of any single technical school; instead, mutual learning and integration may offer the most promising path toward the realization of AGI.

=== Situated robotics: the world as a model ===
Another critique of symbolic AI is the embodied cognition approach:

The embodied cognition approach claims that it makes no sense to consider the brain separately: cognition takes place within a body, which is embedded in an environment. We need to study the system as a whole; the brain's functioning exploits regularities in its environment, including the rest of its body. Under the embodied cognition approach, robotics, vision, and other sensors become central, not peripheral.

Rodney Brooks invented behavior-based robotics, one approach to embodied cognition. Nouvelle AI, another name for this approach, is viewed as an alternative to both symbolic AI and connectionist AI. His approach rejected representations, either symbolic or distributed, as not only unnecessary, but as detrimental. Instead, he created the subsumption architecture, a layered architecture for embodied agents. Each layer achieves a different purpose and must function in the real world. For example, the first robot he describes in Intelligence Without Representation, has three layers. The bottom layer interprets sonar sensors to avoid objects. The middle layer causes the robot to wander around when there are no obstacles. The top layer causes the robot to go to more distant places for further exploration. Each layer can temporarily inhibit or suppress a lower-level layer. He criticized AI researchers for defining AI problems for their systems, when: "There is no clean division between perception (abstraction) and reasoning in the real world." He called his robots "Creatures" and each layer was "composed of a fixed-topology network of simple finite state machines." In the Nouvelle AI approach, "First, it is vitally important to test the Creatures we build in the real world; i.e., in the same world that we humans inhabit. It is disastrous to fall into the temptation of testing them in a simplified world first, even with the best intentions of later transferring activity to an unsimplified world." His emphasis on real-world testing was in contrast to "Early work in AI concentrated on games, geometrical problems, symbolic algebra, theorem proving, and other formal systems" and the use of the blocks world in symbolic AI systems such as SHRDLU.

=== Current views ===
Each approach—symbolic, connectionist, and behavior-based—has advantages, but has been criticized by the other approaches. Symbolic AI has been criticized as disembodied, liable to the qualification problem, and poor in handling the perceptual problems where deep learning excels. In turn, connectionist AI has been criticized as poorly suited for deliberative step-by-step problem solving, incorporating knowledge, and handling planning. Finally, Nouvelle AI excels in reactive and real-world robotics domains but has been criticized for difficulties in incorporating learning and knowledge.

Hybrid AIs incorporating one or more of these approaches are currently viewed as the path forward. Russell and Norvig conclude that:

Overall, Dreyfus saw areas where AI did not have complete answers and said that Al is therefore impossible; we now see many of these same areas undergoing continued research and development leading to increased capability, not impossibility.

== See also ==
- Artificial intelligence
- Automated planning and scheduling
- Automated theorem proving
- Belief revision
- Case-based reasoning
- Cognitive architecture
- Cognitive science
- Connectionism
- Constraint programming
- Deep learning
- First-order logic
- GOFAI
- History of artificial intelligence
- Inductive logic programming
- Knowledge-based systems
- Knowledge representation and reasoning
- Logic programming
- Machine learning
- Model checking
- Model-based reasoning
- Multi-agent system
- Natural language processing
- Neuro-symbolic AI
- Ontology
- Philosophy of artificial intelligence
- Physical symbol systems hypothesis
- Semantic Web
- Sequential pattern mining
- Statistical relational learning
- Symbolic mathematics
- YAGO ontology
- WordNet
