= Intelligence-based design =

Design theory

Intelligence-based design is the purposeful manipulation of the built-environment to effectively engage humans in an essential manner through complex organized information. Intelligence-based theory evidences the conterminous relationship between mind and matter, i.e. the direct neurological evaluations of surface, structure, pattern, texture and form. Intelligence-based theory maintains that our sense of well-being is established through neuro-engagement with the physical world at the deepest level common to all people i.e. "Innate Intelligence."

These precursory readings of the physical environment represent an evolved set of information processing skills that the human mind has developed over millennia through direct lived experience. This physiological engagement with the world operates in a more immediate sense than the summary events of applied meaning or intellectual speculation. It is through this direct neurological engagement that humans connect more fully with the world. Many of mankind's early religious associations with physical structures were informed by an intuitive understanding that structure and materials speak to our deeper self, i.e. the human spirit, the soul. Intelligence based theory reveals this effectual dimension of the built-environment and its relationship to human cognitive development, mental acuity, perceptual awareness, spirituality, and sense of well-being. It is within this realm that the mind's eye connects, or fails to connect, with the world outside. The degree of neuro-connectivity which occurs at these intervals serves to render the built-environment either intelligible or un-intelligible. The study and theory of this occurrence is known as "Intelligence-based design".

== Antecedents ==
Several distinct strands of design thinking, in parallel development, lead towards Intelligence-based design. Christopher Alexander contributed early on to the scientific approach to design, by proposing a theory of design in his book Notes on the Synthesis of Form. Those were the years when artificial intelligence was being developed by Herbert A. Simon, and Alexander was part of that movement. His later work A Pattern Language, although written for architects and urbanists, was picked up by the software community and used as a combinatorial and organizational rubric for software complexity, especially software design patterns. Alexander's most recent work The Nature of Order continues by building up a framework for design that relies upon natural and biological structures. Entirely separate from this, E. O. Wilson introduced the biophilia hypothesis to describe the affinity of humans to other living structures, and to conjecture our innate need for such a connection. This topic was later investigated by Stephen R. Kellert and others, and applied to the design of the artificial environment. The third and independent component of the theory is the recent developments in mobile robotics by Rodney Brooks, where a breakthrough occurred by largely dispensing with internal memory. The practical concept of "Intelligence without representation" otherwise known as the subsumption architecture and behavior-based robotics introduced by Brooks suggests a parallel with the way human beings interact with, and design their own environment. These notions are brought together in Intelligence-based design, which is a topic currently under investigation for design applications in both architecture and urbanism.
