= Interactive planning =

Collaborative approach to planning

Interactive planning is a concept developed by Russell L. Ackoff, an American theorist, early proponent of the field of operations research and recognized as the pioneer in systems thinking. Interactive planning forwards the idea that in order to arrive at a desirable future, one has to create a desirable present and create ways and means to resemble it. One of its unique features is that development should be ideal-oriented. Interactive planning is unlike other types of planning such as reactive planning, inactive planning, and preactive planning.

This is because interactive planning is focused on systems thinking and is "based on the belief that an organization's future depends at least as much on what it does between now and then, as on what is done to it." The organization will then create its future by continuously closing the gap between its current state and its desirable current state. The overall result of a case-based approach conducted by Haftor suggests that IP is a powerful methodology in guiding organizational development.

Interactive planning (IP) is a procedure that prescribes how to develop and manage social systems, e.g. organizations, whether they are business or any other kind. Ackoff (1981) expresses the intention of IP in the following terms: "The objective of interactive planning is an effective pursuit of an idealized state. The state is formulated as a design of that system with which the current system's stakeholders would replace it if they were free to do so. Such a system should be technologically feasible and operationally viable, and it should provide the system with an ability to learn and adapt quickly and effectively."

Interactive planning promotes democratic control by allowing and facilitating the active participation of various stakeholders in the conceptualization and formulation of programs, projects, strategies and techniques. This empowering shift affords the stakeholders to become committed, engaged and grounded decision-makers. Interactive planning, therefore, according to Zeynep Ocak, "expands participants’ conception of what is possible and reveals that the biggest obstructions to achieving the future most desired are often self-imposed constraints”"

Interactive planning also promotes ownership and hence enables the active engagement of stakeholders. It helps map the organization's current standing vis-à-vis its desired future state. As such, interactive planning enables the organization and its members to be reflexive and self-critical in its process of unfolding and becoming. This “interactive and interpretative process” is the essence of “collaborative planning”.

This method makes the plan itself an indispensable resource of the organization because of its groundedness and correspondence with the organization's building blocks, namely its policies, human capital, technologies and financial resources, among others. As a living document, it serves as a built-in mechanism to forge dialogue and discussion among the internal and external stakeholders of the organization. Interactive planning seeks to “facilitate exchange of knowledge between stakeholders, consensus building among them, and group-learning processes.”

This collaborative approach in planning apprehends problems as interrelated realities and hence are not viewed as mutually exclusive. Considering the strong Systems Thinking influence in interactive planning, problems are viewed in their totality and in the context of their specific details in relation to the social environment where they are situated.

Interactive planning has three unique characteristics:

1. Interactive planning works backwards from where an organization wants to be now to where it is now.
2. Interactive planning is continuous; it does not start and stop.
3. Interactive planning lets the organization's stakeholders to be involved in the planning process.

Interactive planning has six phases, divided into two parts: Idealization and Realization.

== Idealisation ==
=== Formulating the mess ===
This is the process of understanding the organization's current state, capabilities, and changes necessary for improvement. To adequately begin formulating the mess, great effort must be taken to understand and learn about the current state of an organization and its environment. This can be called the "state of the organization or situational analysis." Formulating the mess by understanding the state of the organization and by creating a reference projection will enable the organization to "control or influence" its future. This essentially involves appreciating the situation in-depth. This phase is about comprehensively understanding the organization from possible factors that effect its functioning, impinge upon its effectiveness and efficiency, and influences its future direction. According to Ackoff, in the past, situation analysis consisted of identifying the individual problems confronting an organization and classifying these problems as threats and opportunities, prioritizing them, and then focusing the planning in a way that reflected the priorities set on these elements. By the 1970s, planners began to realize that reality does not consist of sets of independent problems, but a system of interacting problems. Therefore, by dealing with any one problem separately, we ignore the fact that the solution to that problem will interact with other problems. So it became necessary to find a way of formulating reality as a system rather than as a set of independent problems. We call such a system a "mess." One of the characteristics of interactive planning is a methodology for formulating messes and treating them through design.

There are four elements in formulating the "mess" during the Interactive Planning process:

1. Systems Analysis,
2. Obstruction Analysis,
3. Reference Projection, and
4. Reference Scenario.

The State of the Organization (i.e. Systems Analysis) provides a detailed description of what the organization currently does. It can be illustrated by flow charts; identification of rules and customs practiced by the organization; disclosure of internal and external conflicts which affect organization performance; and identifying trends that could affect organization performance if it continued on the same behavioral pattern by failing to adapt to the constant changes in the environment.

The progress of an organization may be hindered or disrupted by discrepancies, as well as conflicts present which is the theme of obstruction analysis. This may be conflicts between individual members within the organization, availability of resources, or other existing conflicts.

By beginning to analyze the current operation of the system (State of the Organization), elements that obstruct progress become evidently visible in creating a reference projection.

A reference projection is a projection of the future of the organization based on two false assumptions:

1. There will be no change in the organization's behavior.
2. The relevant future predicted by the organization is complete and correct.

The reference projection should be formed based on the critical success factors of the organization that will lead to its destruction in its projected future. This method of analysis (a reference projection) will produce "how and why the organization will destroy itself." Critical success factors could include an organization's expenses, revenues, return on investments, and safety records. In all instances, the reference projection should sufficiently illustrate the future of the organization if it did not change its behavior. In this sense the reference projection provides a means to identify potential limiting business strategies and suggest ways to avoid serious future failures.

The implications rooting from systems analysis, obstruction analysis, and reference projection combined are concluded in reference scenario; for organizational members to comprehend the ramifications projected in the organization and collaborate on building the necessary changes.

=== Ends planning ===
This is the process of defining what the organization desires to be at the present state, and identifying gaps between the desired present and the current reference projections of the organization. This process is achieved by making explicit exactly what is wanted by an organization. In an organization three specific types of ends are ideals, objectives, and goals. This seeks to work towards identifying the end state that needs to be pursued.

1. Ideals like certain limits in mathematical formulas can be approached endlessly but can never be reached. Therefore, the gaps between the current state of the organization and an ideal can be reached.
2. Objectives are a type of ends that can only be attainable in the long run.
3. Goals are a type of ends that can only be attainable in the short run.

There are three components to achieve Ends Planning:

1. Idealized design: an ideal design by organizational designers which is viable, feasible, malleable, adaptable, controllable and accessible for improvement
2. Design of Management Systems
3. Organizational Design

The identification of participants in Ends Planning necessitates that it is composed of individuals who are immersed in the project/program, "diverse in thought and in gender", "capable of thinking outside the box" and appreciative of the role of research and development (R&D) in organizational development.

== Implementation and Control of Interactive Planning Methodology ==
From Ocak (2015), Interactive Planning Methodology includes the identification of the Five Key Factors that can significantly influence the success of implementation of the new system redesign. This phase identifies the accountability of the what, when, where and how that will make the new system redesign a realization.

1. Human Factor is one of the important aspects for ensuring success in the process of interactive planning. This recognizes the people involved in the realization of the idealized system redesign.
2. Organizational Factor acknowledges the fact that in making a change in an organization, it would require the support of management in all levels. This means that in the whole process of the interactive planning management should be involved and engaged in participation.
3. Work Factor suggests that in any change in the way people work, it would require an effort of constant interaction with people to keep the whole organization on board. This will not only ensure the success of the system redesign, but it will also give opportunities for enhancement that lead to the reinforcement of the plan.
4. Technology Factor is an important tool to utilize for communicating or aligning the initiatives of the plan. Online platforms trigger collaborations and provide an organized way of disseminating information.
5. Commitment Factor differentiates people from the organization that are committed to the cause and those that are just compliant. This factor suggests that in principle, all of the people involved in the interactive planning process can influence the way the plan will be implemented.

According to Ocak (2015), this last phase in the Interactive Planning Methodology can be characterized by design controls as it is being implemented and activated. Crucial tasks should be time bound and tagged to a specific working group. These tasks can be specified in terms of the action item to be done and the method of doing it . A regular update of these tasks is necessary to ensure movement and properly address hurdles as it comes up. All these can ensure the efficient activation of the interactive planning process.

== Evaluation of Interactive Planning Methodology ==
Eriksson (2007) in Giannaris (2011) made an evaluation of IP's empirical usefulness in the development of a medical department at a pharmaceutical company. This time as well, he devised fifteen steps “in terms of [...] Postulates of Interactive Planning, [which] were used as a guide for the actual use of [Interactive Planning] [..] and also [served] as criteria for its evaluation” (p. 4)

== Realization ==
=== Means Planning ===
This is the process of determining what needs to be done to close the gaps between the desired present and the current reference projections of the organization. The main objective of means planning is to determine how the gaps are to be closed or reduced, which will provide the instructions needed to close or reduce those gaps. Means come in different forms, depending on the complexity of the gaps. Types of means include: acts, courses of action or procedures, practices, processes, projects, programs, and policies. If end planning is about the ‘‘what’’, means planning is about the ‘‘how’’. This phase seeks to open a deliberation on the enablers that are required in order to realize the objectives and on the approach that needs to be adopted in order to successfully deliver on the program.

The reference scenario is correlated with the idealized design in order to establish the process in filling the gaps (by resolving, solving or absolving). Predicaments are always in existence and providing a control mechanism as well as a monitoring system can support the process. Establishing a diverse way of addressing the gaps presented by the reference scenario and the idealized design, will entail looking at the way obstruction variables interact and the outcomes produced.

=== Resource Planning ===
This is the process of identifying what resources are needed, when they will be needed, and what to do in case of shortages/excesses. Resource planning relies heavily on means planning because it provides the backbone from how much resources are inevitably needed. Typically in the resource planning stage of interactive planning five types of resources are focused on: money, capital goods, people, consumables, and data. For each resource type, questions to be addressed are:

- How much will be required, where, and when?
- How much will be available at the required time and place?
- How should each shortage or excess be treated?

This phase is regarding anticipating and forecasting on resources—including approaches, tools, information and knowledge—that enable implementation of plans on the ground. A subsequent process that follows Means Planning is the consequences on the resources (inputs, finances, facilities, staff, services, equipment etc.).

=== Design of Implementation ===
This is the process of determining "who, what, when, where and how" the plan will be put into action. Implementation is achieved by creating specific instructions based on the means (selected during the means planning process of interactive planning). It consists of implementation decisions and expectations, which should always be monitored and controlled. In addition, the individuals who make the decisions should be available to those responsible for carrying out the decision.

=== Design of Controls ===
This is the process of deciding how to monitor the implementation of planned decisions and how to evaluate the plan (whether they are effective or not) once implemented. In the control process procedures are created to: identify expectations, monitor decisions, diagnose problems, prescribe corrective action, and providing feedback to facilitate organizational learning and adaptation.

Interactive planning can be used to design and implement many different areas in management systems. For example, interactive planning can be used in assessing whether or not the organization's occupational safety and health goals meet their present and future needs and are seen as a vital part of a corporation's on-going success.

In addition, interactive planning establishes a model for evaluating, comprehending, and initiating change management within a corporation's safety and health program. This model enables Environmental Health and Safety professionals to create a process safety management framework to perform a gap analysis of current work practices compared with current company means to re-direct resources. There are circumstances that corporate safety management need to re-align the prism to provide clear, concise direction to employees and/or responsible senior executives.

=== Comparisons with Value-stream mapping (VSM) and Organization performance model (OPM) ===
Interactive planning is similar to the value-stream mapping (VSM) process in the sense that they both map out the current state and lay out the path towards a future or an ideal state. However, the two are different in the sense that VSM focuses more on the material and information flows in a value stream or supply chain, while interactive planning focuses more on organizational dynamics. Moreover, VSM's primary intent is to expose losses and wastes, and although it also involves basic action-planning, it does not include a deliberate design of controls as in interactive planning.

Interactive planning is also similar to organization performance model (OPM) in the sense that both are concerned with organizational design, and that both involve an assessment phase and a redesign phase (termed as the idealization and the realization parts in the case of interactive planning). However, OPM focuses more on the assessment and redesign of the cultural elements of an organization, while interactive planning covers the broader organizational system.

== Idealized Design ==
Idealized design is the conceptual process in interactive planning. The concept is on a presumed failure of an organization. But the environment, and resources that supported the life of the previous organization still exists, and the decision to design a new system that will replace the last order “right now” subject to "two constraints (technological feasibility and operational viability) and one requirement (the ability to learn and adapt rapidly and effectively)." Organizational planning in the process of replacing a previously failed organization uses an interactive planning concept in designing a new system for the new organization. The author, Russell L. Ackoff, coined this concept during a conference in Bell Laboratories in 1951 held in New Jersey. In the meeting, the Vice President of Bell Labs made a hypothetical statement, “Gentleman, the telephone system of the United States was destroyed last night.” An issue was raised on the research and development system of the company through which the focus of the change is on designing that would improve a whole system, which will then translate into redesigning and developing parts that will fit the whole system. The statement for the new design as “now” rather than any later time is aimed in the present time to eliminate a potential source of error and to focus the organization's direction to the new design to begin at a current time realization of the new organization's system and not on a later time. Also, the concept is better realized when there are virtually no constraints against the new design process; the modification towards the new system becomes more feasible and adaptable to changing internal and external conditions over time.

=== Technological Feasibility Constraints ===
The available technology and knowledge during the time of the design are the only practical means for the design of a system to be considered. Any imaginative techniques, like mental telepathy or concepts which appear to be “science fiction” at the time of the design, should not be included in the planning activity.

=== Operational Viability Constraints ===
The immediate environment of the design process should adhere during the planning activity. The present includes current laws, regulations, and approval standards, where appropriate because the new design intends to be operationally viable in the existing application and use of an organization.

=== Learning and Adaptation ===
An organization is a learning organization that is capable of adapting to internal and external changes. It has the capability of redesigning itself, allowing its internal and external stakeholders to enhance its performance and proactively anticipate change.

== Criticism of Interactive Planning ==
As in any concept, Interactive Planning also has its share of criticisms and most notably from the Marxist-oriented sociological point of view. According to Jackson (2000) as cited in Haftor (2011), there are two key issues raised against IP: (1), it does not challenge power structures present in a managerial structure and (2) in the execution of the IP-process, not all stakeholders have a voice.

In defense of IP, Ackoff: (1) shared his experience wherein he has yet to encounter a situation where power-conflicts could not be addressed; and (2) while he recognized that not all stakeholders are actively involved in the process, he proposed those who do not have full participation may "initially be affiliated to the projects as consultants, and thereafter, as work progresses, be recognized as full members of the project and its decision-making."

Interactive communication in interactive planning at times can have subjective formation of the structure for policy making or redevelopment of organizational system. Such subjective process for drawing new format for organizational key decisions may lead to unsubstantial structure and affect the quality of decision being made. When the management personalities are mixed with ordinary employees, intimidation may happen and the voice of the employees or workers who are members of the committee may not amplify much, thus weakening the goal of achieving concrete solutions for present problems in the organization or company (de Jong and Geerlings, 2003, p. 5).

The policy making or redevelopment of an existing policy or system in the organization or company must be based on research by experts on specified topics or department. Interactive planning with the mix of Subject-Matter-Experts and other employees from different departments may result to formulating popular decision, not necessarily thoroughly processed decisions, which are backed up with data, research, and recommendation from experts (de Jong and Geerlings, 2003, p. 8).

The interactive planning may not be suitable for decision making that involves technical subject. If interactive planning be implemented in matters that involve public policy, the research and technical recommendation from the experts must be conducted first, and the leaders may convene about the recommendations stated in the research so as to arrive at a more sound policy (de Jong and Geerlings, 2003, p. 9).

Also, in the interactive planning process, technical experts may lower down their efforts to address issues as they are mixed with other employees, the dialogue may lead to explaining issues rather than focusing on solving complex problems and giving in-depth research on the topic. The time is not maximized to seek more quality solutions, rather it is spent to harmonize the understanding of concepts and arriving at a more popular consensus (de Jong and Geerlings, 2003, p. 9).

The interactive planning process or steps can be revised by considering segregating the participants into their respective field of expertise and have them research on a given topic and have their recommendations presented in the big group. Doing this will let the big group have more in-depth knowledge about specified area of concern and will give more substantial basis for making decision on policies (de Jong and Geerlings, 2003, p. 9).

Also, the quality of content presented during the interactive planning becomes secondary to the degree of communication skill during the discussion. Ability to persuade members of the committee can influence the decision being made by the rest of the committee members. To balance this, presenters of their recommendation must show tangible data that can back up their statements and arguments so as to produce a more informed body of decision makers. On the other hand, lack of communication skills may bring the substantial data and recommendation into silence. With this, quality research and good communication skills are both important in the interactive planning process (de Jong and Geerlings, 2003, p. 9-10).

However, it is the duty of the presenters to consider their audience, their level of understanding about the technical subject, and to use terms that can be understood generally by the members of the committee. The communication aspect must complement the quality of information or knowledge presented, without overruling the persuasion over truthfulness and accuracy of information (de Jong and Geerlings, 2003, p. 10).

One caution in using Interactive Planning approach for redeveloping the system in the organization or for policy making is the probability of producing bias comments from the same employees who have been part of the previous creation of policy in the organization or company. One way to remedy this is to include new members of the organization and have them prepare well for the convention so as to gain confidence in presenting their recommendations (Haftor, 2011).

Another criticism on Interactive Planning is its tendency to duplicate some old policies and may not fully offer a breakthrough developmental plan or public policy. Also, selection of the participants in the convention determines the quality of information to be delivered and the amount of contribution to be given to the Interactive planning project (Haftor, 2011).

An important criticism on Interactive planning also is the uneven commitment level of the team members. Also the degree of involvement of top-level management is a factor in which the decisions made by the team can be fully implemented. To remedy this, the facilitator of the Interactive planning project must secure the full commitment of the members as well as the top-level managers (Leemann, 2002).

== Basic Groups of Participants in Interactive Planning ==
Planning is the integral process and sub-processes of time and space that deals with preparation, formulation and fruition of decisions about the future. On the other hand, Dror defined planning as a process, whether in formal and legal matters, wherein decisions will have to be approved and implemented by some other body, or a decision maker. It is a set of plan and consequences that needs to be laid down for a decision maker to make an appropriate and reasonable selection. Milovanovic believed that there is an entire chain of a defined process of decision making, and in interactive planning, there are various participants with various intent of actions. Laurini suggested that there are three essential links between the participants in interactive planning: politicians, planners and citizens. Healey delineated the participant groups who are significant in the conversation about the problems in community: technical experts, media, neighbours, activists, interested citizens, business and industrial team, selected officials, administration of local, regional and national level. However, interested parties are not always participant parties. According to Healey, participants can be divided in to three main clusters: income-based sector, administration and non-government organizations as a form of organized citizens. For them the classifications of the participants are anchored on their roles in decision-making. These are the: proposers, decision makers and the public as the third and last interested party.

Milovanovic stressed that in interactive planning, awareness is the paramount motive for an in-depth participation from the different groups. The quality of plan is highly dependent on the quality of life and the quality of space attached to the plan. Citizens as participants of the plan are strongly concern only of those outcome that will affect them personally. The differences in capabilities, resources, and qualifications also influence the quality of the decisions. Because of these differences, Millovanovic suggested to create a division of the participants to warrant the participation of the public and other interest groups.

== Incorporating Diversity and Inclusion in Interactive Planning ==
Diversity refers to the traits and characteristics that make people unique while inclusion refers to the behaviors and social norms that ensure people feel welcome. Diversity can range from differences in races, ethnicities, genders, ages, religions, disabilities, and sexual orientations. It also encompasses differences in education, personalities, skill sets, experiences, and knowledge bases.

The word interactive from a people perspective is defined as two people influencing each other. In planning, interaction would be more fruitious if different perspectives were brought into the table. Varying perspectives would arise from individual personalities with unique life experiences. Diversity is expressed in welcoming participants of different walks of life. Inclusion is realized and fulfilled when the perspectives opined by the participants are taken into consideration.

Although there is beauty in uniformity, there is more in diversity, more so in inclusion.
