= Lynne Parker =

American AI policymaker and roboticist

Lynne E. Parker
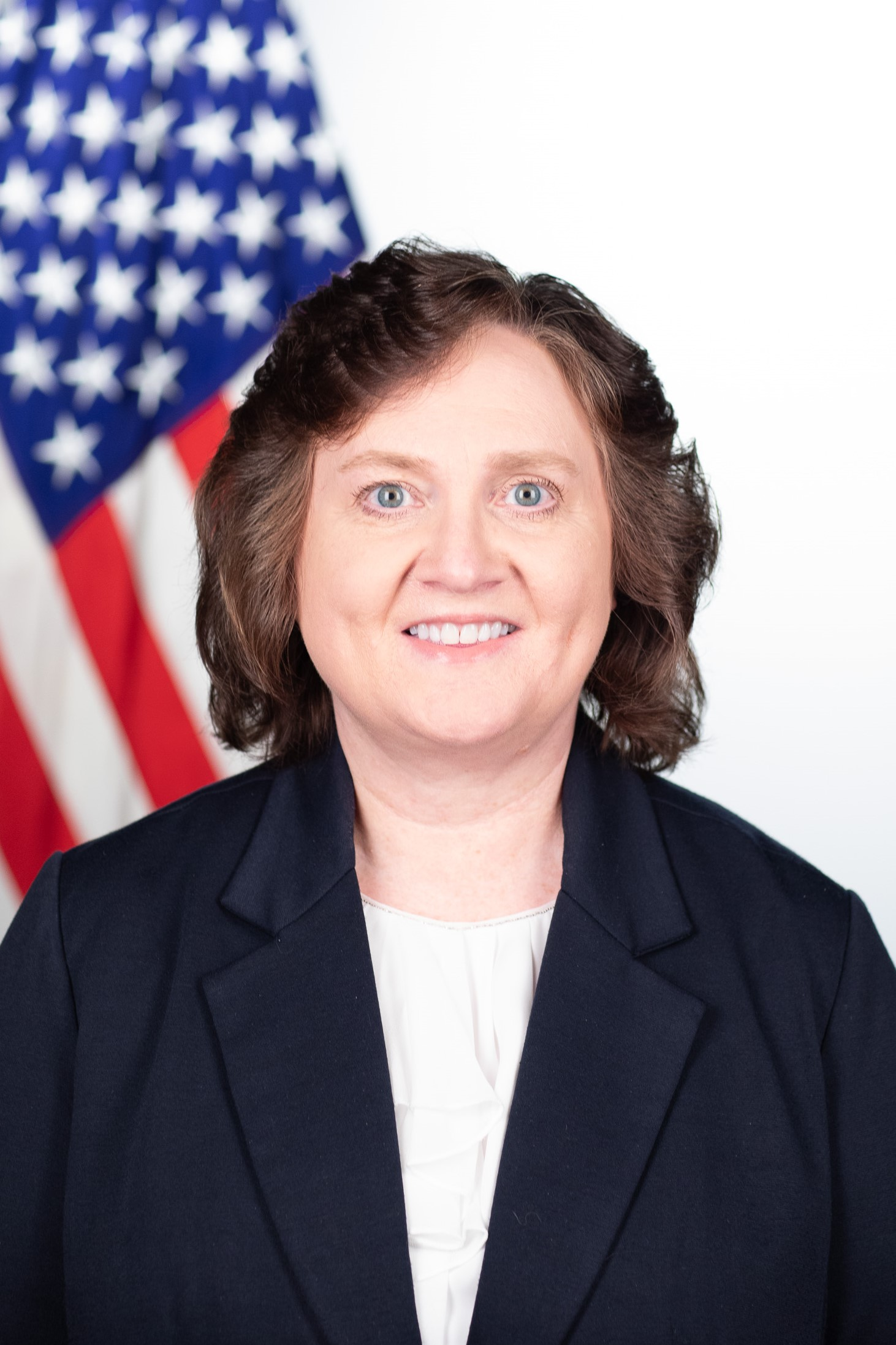

Principal Deputy Director of the White House Office of Science and Technology Policy
- Incumbent
- Assumed office January 20, 2025
- President: Donald Trump
- Preceded by: Lara Campbell

Executive Director of the President's Council of Advisors on Science and Technology
- Incumbent
- Assumed office January 20, 2025

Personal details
- Education: Tennessee Technological University (BS); University of Tennessee, Knoxville (MS); Massachusetts Institute of Technology (PhD)
- Scientific career
- Fields: Computer science Robotics
- Workplaces: Oak Ridge National Laboratory; University of Tennessee
- Thesis: Heterogeneous Multi-Robot Cooperation (1994)
- Doctoral advisor: Rodney Brooks

Lynne Edwards Parker is Principal Deputy Director of the White House Office of Science and Technology Policy and Executive Director of the President's Council of Advisors on Science and Technology. She is also Associate Vice Chancellor Emerita (retired) and Founding Director of the AI Tennessee Initiative at the University of Tennessee. Previously, she was Deputy United States Chief Technology Officer and Founding Director of the National Artificial Intelligence Initiative Office at the United States' White House Office of Science and Technology Policy. She is an American AI policymaker, and a roboticist specializing in multi-robot systems, swarm robotics, and distributed artificial intelligence.

Parker has warned that AI will replace jobs where human tasks can be performed more efficiently by computers, create deep fakes, and be used by authoritarian governments for surveillance and to repress dissent; but that there are positive aspects to AI such as improving healthcare, personalized learning, and making consumer products more safe.

== Education and career ==
Parker is originally from Knoxville, Tennessee. Following her older sister into technology, she majored in computer science at Tennessee Technological University, graduating in 1983. After a master's degree in computer science at the University of Tennessee in 1988, she completed her Ph.D. at the Massachusetts Institute of Technology in 1994. Her dissertation, Heterogeneous Multi-Robot Cooperation, was supervised by Rodney Brooks.

She joined the Oak Ridge National Laboratory (ORNL) as a robotics researcher while she was a master's student, taking a leave for her doctorate. She moved from ORNL to the University of Tennessee in 2002. She was interim dean of the Tickle College of Engineering, before taking a leave from the faculty to join the White House Office of Science and Technology Policy in 2018. She was named founding director of the National Artificial Intelligence Initiative Office in 2021.

On December 22, 2024, Donald Trump announced he would select Parker to be Executive Director of the President's Council of Advisors on Science and Technology and Counselor to the Director of the White House Office of Science and Technology Policy, effective January 20, 2025.

== Recognition ==
Parker was named an IEEE Fellow in 2010, "for contributions to distributed and heterogeneous multi-robot systems". She was named a Fellow of the Association for the Advancement of Artificial Intelligence in 2022, "for pioneering research in distributed robotics and exceptional leadership in AI policy". She is also a Fellow of the American Association for the Advancement of Science.

In 2014, Tennessee Tech gave her their Computer Scientist of Distinction Award.

In 2023, Computing Research Association awarded her the Distinguished Service Award for her unparalleled impact on the computing research community.
