= Situated robotics =

AI agent which is embedded in an environment

In artificial intelligence and cognitive science, the term situated refers to an agent which is embedded in an environment. In this context, the term is used to refer to robots, but some researchers argue that software agents can also be situated if:

- they exist in a dynamic (rapidly changing) environment, which
- they can manipulate or change through their actions, and which
- they can sense or perceive.

Being situated is generally considered to be part of being embodied, but it is useful to take both perspectives. The situated perspective emphasizes the environment and the agent's interactions with it. These interactions define an agent's embodiment.

== See also ==
- Robot general heading
- Cognitive agents
- Scruffies - people who tend to worry about whether their agent is situated.
