= Advice taker =

Concept in computer science

The advice taker was a hypothetical computer program, proposed by John McCarthy in his 1959 paper "Programs with Common Sense". It was probably the first proposal to use logic to represent information in a computer and not just as the subject matter of another program. It may also have been the first paper to propose common sense reasoning ability as the key to Artificial Intelligence. In his paper, McCarthy advocated:

"…programs to manipulate in a suitable formal language (most likely a part of the predicate calculus) common instrumental statements. The basic program will draw immediate conclusions from a list of premises. These conclusions will be either declarative or imperative sentences. When an imperative sentence is deduced the program takes a corresponding action."

McCarthy justified his proposal as follows:

"The main advantages we expect the advice taker to have is that its behaviour will be improvable merely by making statements to it, telling it about its symbolic environment and what is wanted from it. To make these statements will require little if any knowledge of the program or the previous knowledge of the advice taker. One will be able to assume that the advice taker will have available to it a fairly wide class of immediate logical consequences of anything it is told and its previous knowledge. This property is expected to have much in common with what makes us describe certain humans as having common sense. We shall therefore say that a program has common sense if it automatically deduces for itself a sufficiently wide class of immediate consequences of anything it is told and what it already knows."
