= Commonsense knowledge (artificial intelligence) =

Facts assumed to be known to all humans

In artificial intelligence research, commonsense knowledge consists of facts about the everyday world, such as "Lemons are sour" or "Cows say moo", that all humans are expected to know. It is currently an unsolved problem in artificial general intelligence. The first AI program to address common sense knowledge was Advice Taker in 1959 by John McCarthy.

Commonsense knowledge can underpin a commonsense reasoning process, to attempt inferences such as "You might bake a cake because you want people to eat the cake." A natural language processing process can be attached to the commonsense knowledge base to allow the knowledge base to attempt to answer questions about the world. Common sense knowledge also helps to solve problems in the face of incomplete information. Using widely held beliefs about everyday objects, or common sense knowledge, AI systems make common sense assumptions or default assumptions about the unknown similar to the way people do. In an AI system or in English, this is expressed as "Normally P holds", "Usually P" or "Typically P so Assume P". For example, if we know the fact "Tweety is a bird", because we know the commonly held belief about birds, "typically birds fly," without knowing anything else about Tweety, we may reasonably assume the fact that "Tweety can fly." As more knowledge of the world is discovered or learned over time, the AI system can revise its assumptions about Tweety using a truth maintenance process. If we later learn that "Tweety is a penguin" then truth maintenance revises this assumption because we also know "penguins do not fly".

== Commonsense reasoning ==
Commonsense reasoning simulates the human ability to use commonsense knowledge to make presumptions about the type and essence of ordinary situations they encounter every day, and to change their "minds" should new information come to light. This includes time, missing or incomplete information and cause and effect. The ability to explain cause and effect is an important aspect of explainable AI. Truth maintenance algorithms automatically provide an explanation facility because they create elaborate records of presumptions. Compared with humans, all existing computer programs that attempt human-level AI perform extremely poorly on modern "commonsense reasoning" benchmark tests such as the Winograd Schema Challenge. The problem of attaining human-level competency at "commonsense knowledge" tasks is considered to probably be "AI complete" (that is, solving it would require the ability to synthesize a fully human-level intelligence), although some oppose this notion and believe compassionate intelligence is also required for human-level AI. Common sense reasoning has been applied successfully in more limited domains such as natural language processing and automated diagnosis or analysis.

== Commonsense knowledge base construction ==
Compiling comprehensive knowledge bases of commonsense assertions (CSKBs) is a long-standing challenge in AI research. From early expert-driven efforts like CYC and WordNet, significant advances were achieved via the crowdsourced OpenMind Commonsense project, which led to the crowdsourced ConceptNet KB. Several approaches have attempted to automate CSKB construction, most notably, via text mining (WebChild, Quasimodo, TransOMCS, Ascent), as well as harvesting these directly from pre-trained language models (AutoTOMIC). These resources are significantly larger than ConceptNet, though the automated construction mostly makes them of moderately lower quality. Challenges also remain on the representation of commonsense knowledge: Most CSKB projects follow a triple data model, which is not necessarily best suited for breaking more complex natural language assertions. A notable exception here is GenericsKB, which applies no further normalization to sentences, but retains them in full.

== Applications ==
Around 2013, MIT researchers developed BullySpace, an extension of the commonsense knowledgebase ConceptNet, to catch taunting social media comments. BullySpace included over 200 semantic assertions based around stereotypes, to help the system infer that comments like "Put on a wig and lipstick and be who you really are" are more likely to be an insult if directed at a boy than a girl.

ConceptNet has also been used by chatbots and by computers that compose original fiction. At Lawrence Livermore National Laboratory, common sense knowledge was used in an intelligent software agent to detect violations of a comprehensive nuclear test ban treaty.

== Data ==
As an example, as of 2012 ConceptNet includes these 21 language-independent relations:

- IsA (A "RV" is a "vehicle" | X is an instance of Y)
- UsedFor (a "cake tin" is used for "making cakes" | X is used for the purpose Y)
- HasA (A "rabbit" has a "tail" | X possesses Y element or feature)
- CapableOf (a "cook" is capable of "making baked goods" | X is capable of doing Y)
- Desires (a "child" desires "the aroma of baking" | X has a desire for Y)
- CreatedBy ("cake" is created by a "baker" | X is created by Y)
- PartOf (a "knife" is part of a "knife set" | X is part of Y)
- Causes ("Heat" causes "cooking"| X is what causes Y)
- LocatedNear (the "oven" is located near the "refrigerator" | X is located near Y)
- AtLocation (A "Cook" is at the (location) "restaurant" | X is at (the location) Y)
- DefinedAs (a "Cupcake" is defined as a "cake" that also has the qualities of being "small", "baked within a wrapper", and "containing only one area of frosting or icing" | X is defined as Y that also has the properties A, B & C)
- SymbolOf (a "heart" is a symbol of "affection" | X is a symbolic representation of Y)
- ReceivesAction ("cake" can receive the action of being "eaten" | X is capable of receiving action Y)
- HasPrerequisite ("baking" has the prerequisite of obtaining the "ingredients" | X cannot do Y unless A does B)
- MotivatedByGoal ("baking" is motivated by the goal of "consumption"/"eating" | X has the motivation of Y as a supergoal)
- CausesDesire ("baking" makesYou want to "follow recipe" | X causes the desire to do Y)
- MadeOf ("Cake" is made of "flour"/"eggs"/"sugar"/"oil"/etc | X is made of Y)
- HasFirstSubevent ("baking" has first subevent "make batter" | To complete X the first thing that needs to be done is Y)
- HasSubevent ("eat" has subevent "swallow" | Doing Y is one of the requisites for completing X)
- HasLastSubevent ("dressingUp" has the last subevent of "wearingShoes" |Y is the last subevent before the completion of X)

== Commonsense knowledge bases ==
- Cyc
- Open Mind Common Sense (data source) and ConceptNet (datastore and NLP engine)
- Evi
- Graphiq

== See also ==
- Common sense
- Linked data and the Semantic Web
- Truth Maintenance or Reason Maintenance
- Ontology
