= Neats and scruffies =

Forms of artificial intelligence research

In the history of artificial intelligence (AI), neat and scruffy are two contrasting approaches to AI research. The distinction was made in the 1970s, and was a subject of discussion until the mid-1980s.

"Neats" use algorithms based on a single formal paradigm, such as logic, mathematical optimization, or neural networks. Neats verify their programs are correct via rigorous mathematical theory. Neat researchers and analysts tend to express the hope that this single formal paradigm can be extended and improved in order to achieve general intelligence and superintelligence.

"Scruffies" use any number of different algorithms and methods to achieve intelligent behavior, and rely on incremental testing to verify their programs. Scruffy programming requires large amounts of hand coding and knowledge engineering. Scruffy experts have argued that general intelligence can only be implemented by solving a large number of essentially unrelated problems, and that there is no silver bullet that will allow programs to develop general intelligence autonomously.

John Brockman compares the neat approach to physics, in that it uses simple mathematical models as its foundation. The scruffy approach is more biological, in that much of the work involves studying and categorizing diverse phenomena. (Note: John Brockman writes "Chomsky has always adopted the physicist's philosophy of science, which is that you have hypotheses you check out, and that you could be wrong. This is absolutely antithetical to the AI philosophy of science, which is much more like the way a biologist looks at the world. The biologist's philosophy of science says that human beings are what they are, you find what you find, you try to understand it, categorize it, name it, and organize it. If you build a model and it doesn't work quite right, you have to fix it. It's much more of a "discovery" view of the world.")

Modern AI has elements of both scruffy and neat approaches. Scruffy AI researchers in the 1990s applied mathematical rigor to their programs, as neat experts did. They also express the hope that there is a single paradigm (a "master algorithm") that will cause general intelligence and superintelligence to emerge. But modern AI also resembles the scruffies: modern machine learning applications require a great deal of hand-tuning and incremental testing; while the general algorithm is mathematically rigorous, accomplishing the specific goals of a particular application is not.

== Origin in the 1970s ==
The distinction between neat and scruffy originated in the mid-1970s, by Roger Schank. Schank used the terms to characterize the difference between his work on natural language processing (which represented commonsense knowledge in the form of large amorphous semantic networks) from the work of John McCarthy, Allen Newell, Herbert A. Simon, Robert Kowalski and others whose work was based on logic and formal extensions of logic. Schank described himself as an AI scruffy. He made this distinction in linguistics, arguing strongly against Chomsky's view of language.

The distinction was also partly geographical and cultural: "scruffy" attributes were exemplified by AI research at MIT under Marvin Minsky in the 1970s. The laboratory was famously "freewheeling" and researchers often developed AI programs by spending long hours fine-tuning programs until they showed the required behavior. Important and influential "scruffy" programs developed at MIT included Joseph Weizenbaum's ELIZA, which behaved as if it spoke English, without any formal knowledge at all, and Terry Winograd's (Note: Winograd also became a critic of early approaches to AI as well, arguing that intelligent machines could not be built using formal symbols exclusively, but required embodied cognition.) SHRDLU, which could successfully answer queries and carry out actions in a simplified world consisting of blocks and a robot arm. SHRDLU, while successful, could not be scaled up into a useful natural language processing system, because it lacked a structured design. Maintaining a larger version of the program proved to be impossible, i.e. it was too scruffy to be extended.

Other AI laboratories (of which the largest were Stanford, Carnegie Mellon University and the University of Edinburgh) focused on logic and formal problem solving as a basis for AI. These institutions supported the work of John McCarthy, Herbert Simon, Allen Newell, Donald Michie, Robert Kowalski, and other "neats".

The contrast between MIT's approach and other laboratories was also described as a "procedural/declarative distinction". Programs like SHRDLU were designed as agents that carried out actions. They executed "procedures". Other programs were designed as inference engines that manipulated formal statements (or "declarations") about the world and translated these manipulations into actions.

In his 1983 presidential address to Association for the Advancement of Artificial Intelligence, Nils Nilsson discussed the issue, arguing that "the field needed both". He wrote "much of the knowledge we want our programs to have can and should be represented declaratively in some kind of declarative, logic-like formalism. Ad hoc structures have their place, but most of these come from the domain itself." Alex P. Pentland and Martin Fischler of SRI International concurred about the anticipated role of deduction and logic-like formalisms in future AI research, but not to the extent that Nilsson described.

== Scruffy projects in the 1980s ==
The scruffy approach was applied to robotics by Rodney Brooks in the mid-1980s. He advocated building robots that were, as he put it, Fast, Cheap and Out of Control, the title of a 1989 paper co-authored with Anita Flynn. Unlike earlier robots such as Shakey or the Stanford cart, they did not build up representations of the world by analyzing visual information with algorithms drawn from mathematical machine learning techniques, and they did not plan their actions using formalizations based on logic, such as the 'Planner' language. They simply reacted to their sensors in a way that tended to help them survive and move.

Douglas Lenat's Cyc project was initiated in 1984, one of the earliest and most ambitious projects to capture all of human knowledge in machine readable form; it was described as "a determinedly scruffy enterprise". The Cyc database contains millions of facts about the world, each of which are used to add to the complexity of the overall system, in an attempt to create AI that can understand common-sense knowledge.

== The Society of Mind ==
In 1986 Marvin Minsky published The Society of Mind which advocated a view of intelligence and the mind as an interacting community of modules or agents that each handled different aspects of cognition, where some modules were specialized for very specific tasks (e.g. edge detection in the visual cortex) and other modules were specialized to manage communication and prioritization (e.g. planning and attention in the frontal lobes). Minsky presented this paradigm as a model of both biological human intelligence and as a blueprint for future work in AI.

This paradigm is explicitly "scruffy" in that it does not expect there to be a single algorithm that can be applied to all of the tasks involved in intelligent behavior. Minsky wrote:

What magical trick makes us intelligent? The trick is that there is no trick. The power of intelligence stems from our vast diversity, not from any single, perfect principle.

As of 1991, Minsky was still publishing papers evaluating the relative advantages of the neat versus scruffy approaches, e.g. “Logical Versus Analogical or Symbolic Versus Connectionist or Neat Versus Scruffy”.

== Modern AI as both neat and scruffy ==
New statistical and mathematical approaches to AI were developed in the 1990s, using highly developed formalisms such as mathematical optimization and neural networks. Pamela McCorduck wrote that "As I write, AI enjoys a Neat hegemony, people who believe that machine intelligence, at least, is best expressed in logical, even mathematical terms." This general trend towards more formal methods in AI was described as "the victory of the neats" by Peter Norvig and Stuart Russell in 2003.

However, by 2021, Russell and Norvig had changed their minds. Deep learning networks and machine learning in general require extensive fine tuning – they must be iteratively tested until they begin to show the desired behavior. This is a scruffy methodology.

== Well-known examples ==
Neats

- John McCarthy
- Allen Newell
- Herbert A. Simon
- Edward Feigenbaum
- Robert Kowalski
- Judea Pearl

Scruffies

- Rodney Brooks
- Terry Winograd
- Marvin Minsky
- Roger Schank
- Doug Lenat

== See also ==
- History of artificial intelligence
- Soft computing
- Symbolic AI
- Philosophy of artificial intelligence
- Worse is better
