= Behavior-based robotics =

Branch of robotics

Behavior-based robotics (BBR) or behavioral robotics is an approach in robotics that focuses on robots that are able to exhibit complex-appearing behaviors despite little internal variable state to model its immediate environment, mostly gradually correcting its actions via sensory-motor links.

== Principles ==
Behavior-based robotics sets itself apart from traditional artificial intelligence by using biological systems as a model. Classic artificial intelligence typically uses a set of steps to solve problems, it follows a path based on internal representations of events compared to the behavior-based approach. Rather than use preset calculations to tackle a situation, behavior-based robotics relies on adaptability. This advancement has allowed behavior-based robotics to become commonplace in researching and data gathering.

Most behavior-based systems are also reactive, which means they need no programming of what a chair looks like, or what kind of surface the robot is moving on. Instead, all the information is gleaned from the input of the robot's sensors. The robot uses that information to gradually correct its actions according to the changes in immediate environment.

Behavior-based robots (BBR) usually show more biological-appearing actions than their computing-intensive counterparts, which are very deliberate in their actions. A BBR often makes mistakes, repeats actions, and appears confused, but can also show the anthropomorphic quality of tenacity. Comparisons between BBRs and insects are frequent because of these actions. BBRs are sometimes considered examples of weak artificial intelligence, although some have claimed they are models of all intelligence.

== Features ==
Most behavior-based robots are programmed with a basic set of features to start them off. They are given a behavioral repertoire to work with dictating what behaviors to use and when, obstacle avoidance and battery charging can provide a foundation to help the robots learn and succeed. Rather than build world models, behavior-based robots simply react to their environment and problems within that environment. They draw upon internal knowledge learned from their past experiences combined with their basic behaviors to resolve problems.

== History ==
The school of behavior-based robots owes much to work undertaken in the 1980s at the Massachusetts Institute of Technology by Rodney Brooks, who with students and colleagues built a series of wheeled and legged robots utilizing the subsumption architecture. Brooks' papers, often written with lighthearted titles such as "Planning is just a way of avoiding figuring out what to do next", the anthropomorphic qualities of his robots, and the relatively low cost of developing such robots, popularized the behavior-based approach.

Brooks' work builds—whether by accident or not—on two prior milestones in the behavior-based approach. In the 1950s, W. Grey Walter, an English scientist with a background in neurological research, built a pair of vacuum tube-based robots that were exhibited at the 1951 Festival of Britain, and which have simple but effective behavior-based control systems.

The second milestone is Valentino Braitenberg's 1984 book, "Vehicles – Experiments in Synthetic Psychology" (MIT Press). He describes a series of thought experiments demonstrating how simply wired sensor/motor connections can result in some complex-appearing behaviors such as fear and love.

Later work in BBR is from the BEAM robotics community, which has built upon the work of Mark Tilden. Tilden was inspired by the reduction in the computational power needed for walking mechanisms from Brooks' experiments (which used one microcontroller for each leg), and further reduced the computational requirements to that of logic chips, transistor-based electronics, and analog circuit design.

A different direction of development includes extensions of behavior-based robotics to multi-robot teams. The focus in this work is on developing simple generic mechanisms that result in coordinated group behavior, either implicitly or explicitly.

== See also ==
- Autonomous robot
- Bio-inspired robotics
- Embodied cognitive science
- Hierarchical control system
- Luc Steels
- Nouvelle AI
- Situated robotics
