= Rodney Brooks =

Australian roboticist (born 1954)

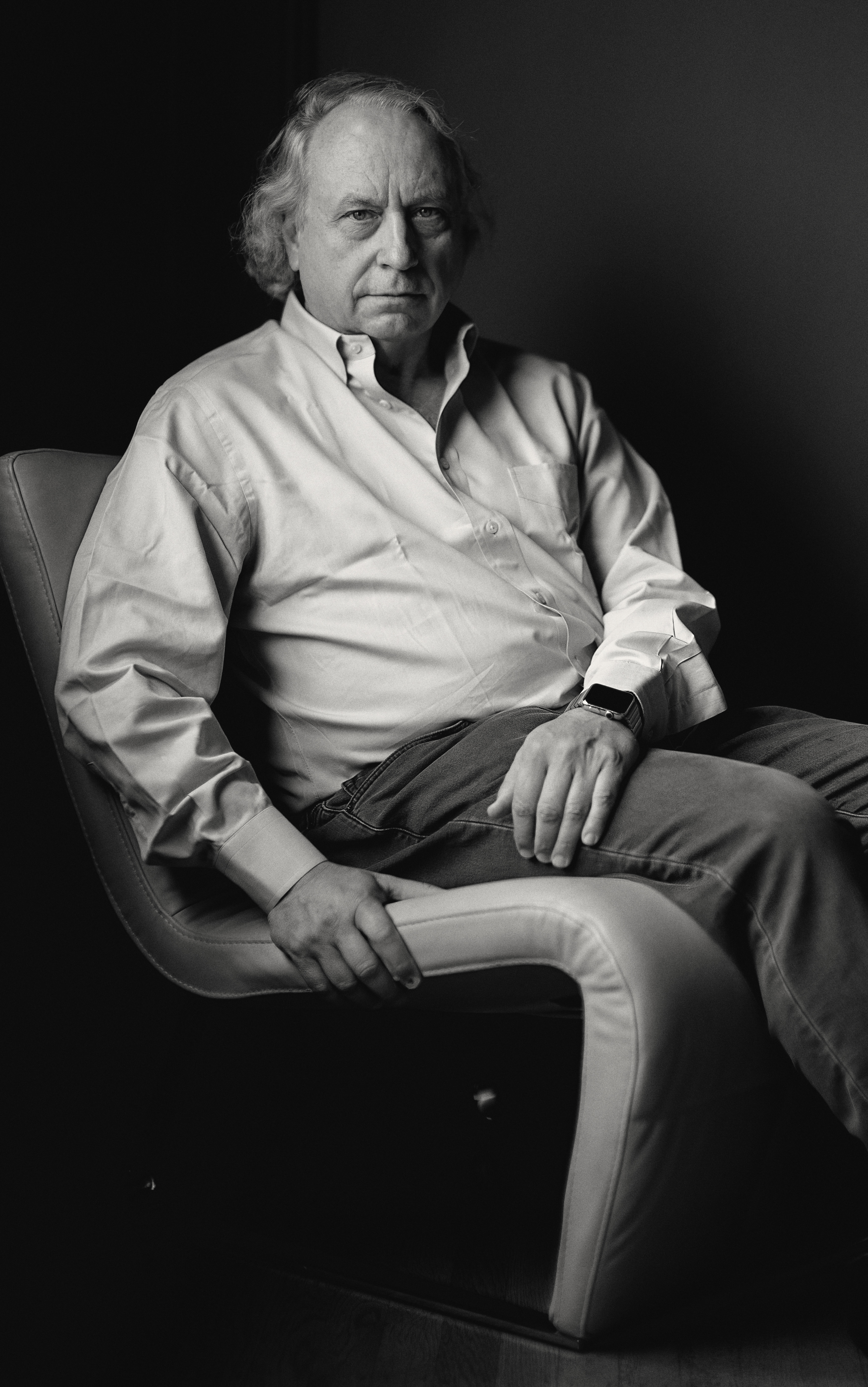
- Brooks in 2021
- Born: Rodney Allen Brooks; 30 December 1954 (age 71); Adelaide, Australia
- Education: Stanford University; Flinders University
- Awards: IJCAI Computers and Thought Award
- Scientific career
- Fields: Robotics
- Workplaces: Stanford University; MIT
- Doctoral students: Lynne Parker; Maja Matarić; Charles Lee Isbell Jr. Cynthia Breazeal; Yoky Matsuoka; Holly Yanco
- Website: rodneybrooks.com

Rodney Allen Brooks (born 30 December 1954) is an Australian roboticist and Fellow of the Australian Academy of Science who popularized the actionist approach to robotics. He was a Panasonic Professor of Robotics at the Massachusetts Institute of Technology and former director of the MIT Computer Science and Artificial Intelligence Laboratory.

He is a founder and former chief technical officer of iRobot and co-founder, chairman and chief technical officer of Rethink Robotics (formerly Heartland Robotics) and is the co-founder and chief technical officer of Robust.AI (founded in 2019).

== Life ==
Brooks was born in 1954 in Australia. Brooks received an M.A. in pure mathematics from Flinders University of South Australia. In 1981, he received a PhD in computer science from Stanford University under the supervision of Thomas Binford. He has held research positions at Carnegie Mellon University and MIT and a faculty position at Stanford University.

He joined the MIT faculty in 1984. He was Panasonic Professor of Robotics at the Massachusetts Institute of Technology. He was director of the MIT Computer Science and Artificial Intelligence Laboratory (1997–2007), previously the "Artificial Intelligence Laboratory".

In 1997, Brooks and his work were featured in the film Fast, Cheap & Out of Control.

Brooks became a member of the National Academy of Engineering in 2004 for contributions to the foundations and applications of robotics, including establishing consumer and hazardous environment robotics industries.

== Work ==
=== Academic work ===
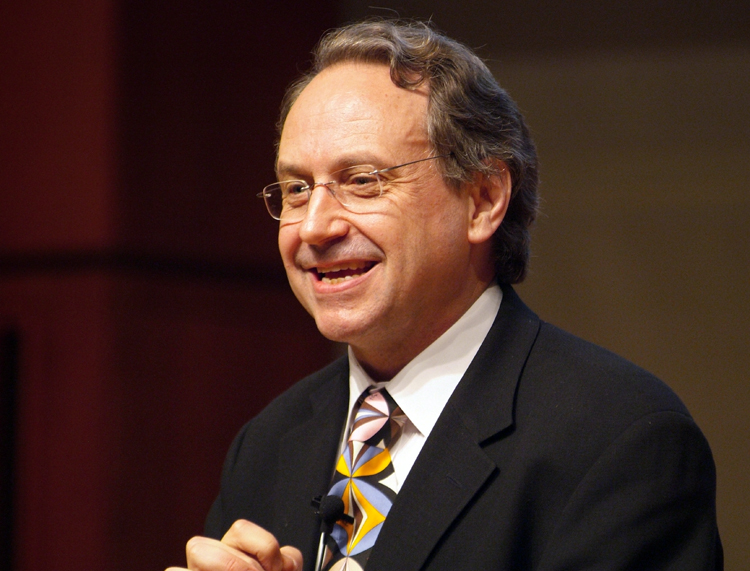
Brooks in 2005

Instead of computation as the ultimate conceptual metaphor that helped artificial intelligence become a separate discipline in the scientific community, he proposed that action or behavior is more appropriate to be used in robotics. Critical of applying the computational metaphor, even to the fields where the action metaphor is more relevant, he wrote in 2008 that:

Some of my colleagues have managed to recast Pluto's orbital behavior as the body itself carrying out computations on forces that apply to it. I think we are perhaps better off using Newtonian mechanics (with a little Einstein thrown in) to understand and predict the orbits of planets and others. It is so much simpler.

In his 1990 paper, "Elephants Don't Play Chess", Brooks argued that for robots to accomplish everyday tasks in an environment shared by humans, their higher cognitive abilities, including abstract thinking emulated by symbolic reasoning, need to be based on the primarily sensory-motor coupling (action) with the environment, complemented by the proprioceptive sense which is a critical component in hand–eye coordination, pointing out that:

Over time there's been a realization that vision, sound-processing, and early language are maybe the keys to how our brain is organized.

=== Industrial work ===
Brooks was an entrepreneur before leaving academia to found Rethink Robotics. He was one of ten founders of Lucid Inc., and worked with them until the company's closure in 1993. Before Lucid closed, Brooks had founded iRobot with former students Colin Angle and Helen Greiner.

=== Robots ===
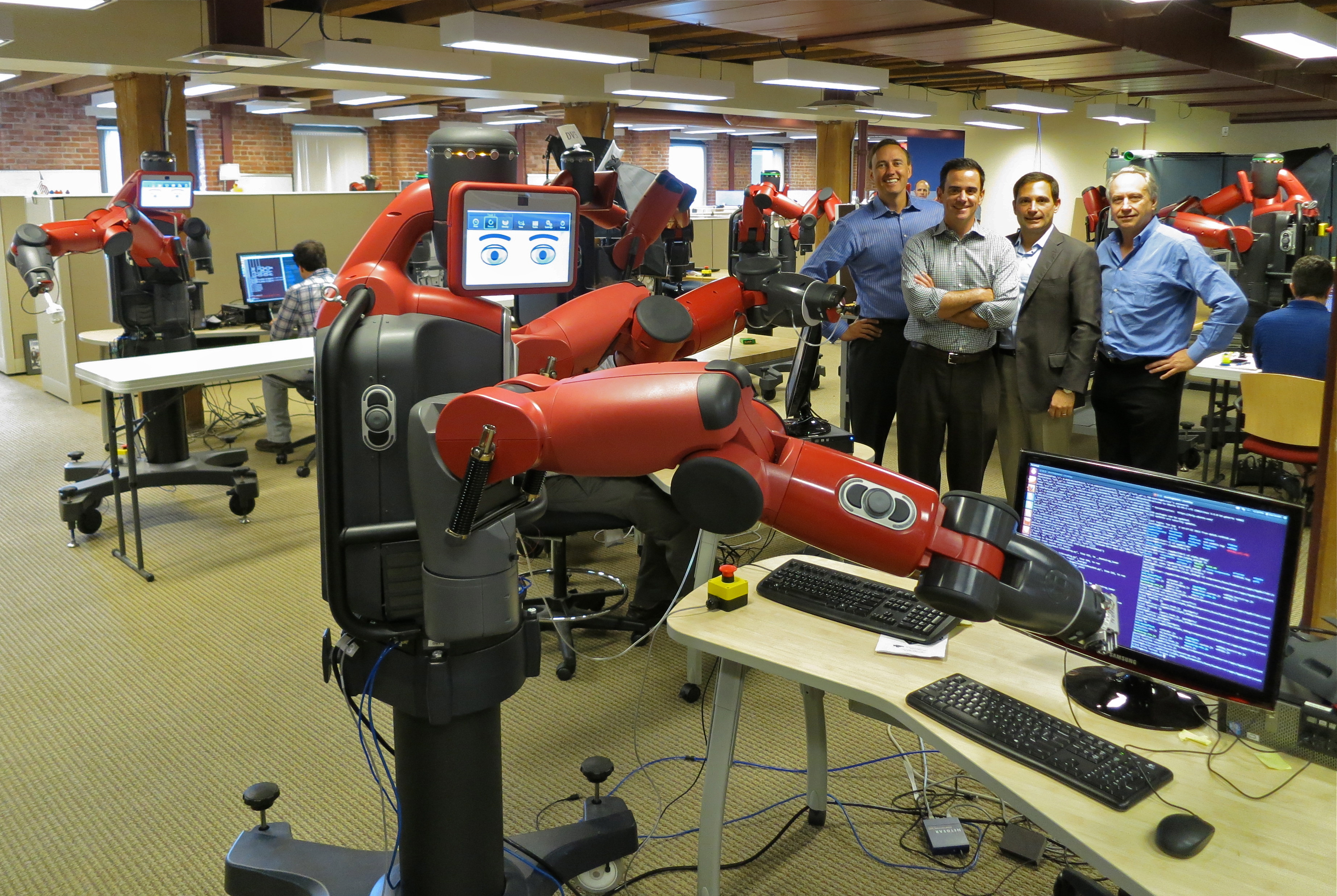
Robot at Rethink Robotics, 2013. Brooks is at the right in the lineup behind the robot. At left is Steve Jurvetson, the photographer.

He experimented with off-the-shelf components, such as Fischertechnik and Lego, and tried to make robots self-replicate by putting together clones of themselves using the components. His robots include mini-robots used in oil wells explorations without cables, the robots that searched for survivors at Ground Zero in New York, and the robots used in medicine doing robotic surgery.

Allen

In the late 1980s, Brooks and his team introduced Allen, a robot using subsumption architecture. As of 2012 Brooks' work focused on engineering intelligent robots to operate in unstructured environments and understanding human intelligence through building humanoid robots.

Baxter

Introduced in 2012 by Rethink Robotics, an industrial robot named Baxter was intended as the robotic analogue of the early personal computer designed to safely interact with neighbouring human workers and be programmable for the performance of simple tasks. The robot stops if it encounters a human in the way of its robotic arm and has a prominent off switch that its human partner can push if necessary. Costs were projected to be the equivalent of a worker making $4 an hour.

Carter

In 2024, Robust.AI introduced Carter, a mobile robot.

=== AI ===
In June 2024, Brooks said that humans overestimate generative AI's abilities.

== Bibliography ==
- Brooks, Rodney (March 1986). "A robust layered control system for a mobile robot". IEEE Journal of Robotics and Automation. 2 (1): 14–23. Bibcode:1986IJRA....2...14B. doi:10.1109/jra.1986.1087032. hdl:1721.1/6432. S2CID 10542804.
- Rodney Brooks (1989), "A Robot that Walks; Emergent Behaviors from a Carefully Evolved Network" (PDF), Neural Computation, 1 (2): 253–262, doi:10.1162/neco.1989.1.2.253, hdl:1721.1/6500, S2CID 33987248
- Brooks, Rodney (1990), "Elephants Don't Play Chess" (PDF), Robotics and Autonomous Systems, 6 (1–2): 3–15, doi:10.1016/S0921-8890(05)80025-9.
- Rodney Brooks (January 1991), "Intelligence without representation", Artificial Intelligence, 47 (1–3): 139–159, doi:10.1016/0004-3702(91)90053-M, S2CID 207507849
- Steels, Luc; Brooks, Rodney, eds. (1995), The Artificial Life Route to Artificial Intelligence: Building Embodied, Situated Agents, Hillsdale, New Jersey: Lawrence Erlbaum Associates, ISBN 978-0-8058-1519-1 Alternative ISBN 0-8058-1518-X
- Brooks, Rodney A.; Maes, Pattie, eds. (1996), Artificial Life: Proceedings of the Fourth International Workshop on the Synthesis and Simulation of Living Systems, Cambridge, Massachusetts: MIT Press, ISBN 978-0-262-52190-1
- Rodney Brooks (1999), Cambrian Intelligence: The Early History of the New AI, MIT Press, ISBN 978-0-262-52263-2
- K. Warwick "Out of the Shady age: the best of robotics compilation", Review of Cambrian Intelligence: the early history of AI, by R A Brooks, Times Higher Education Supplement, p. 32, 15 September 2000.
- The Relationship Between Matter and Life (in Nature 409, pp. 409–411; 2001)
- Flesh and Machines: How Robots Will Change Us (Pantheon, 2002) ISBN 0-375-42079-7
- Thrun, Sebastian; Brooks, Rodney Allen; Durrant-Whyte, Hugh, eds. (2007), Robotics Research: Results of the 12th International Symposium ISSR, Berlin & Heidelberg: Springer-Verlag, ISBN 9783540481102
- Brooks, Rodney (May–June 2013). "Robots at work : towards a smarter factory". The Futurist. 47 (3): 24–27.
- Brooks contributed one chapter to Architects of Intelligence: The Truth About AI from the People Building it, Packt Publishing, 2018, ISBN 978-1-78-913151-2, by the American futurist Martin Ford.
- "Fields of Color: The Theory that Escaped Einstein", by Rodney Allen Brooks; self-published (iir/uc) by Rodney A. Brooks, 2016 - General relativity (Physics) - 149 pages (PS: Now (2026) in its 3rd edition.)

== See also ==
- Nouvelle AI
