= RuleML Symposium =

International academic conference

- Abbreviation: RuleML
- Discipline: Artificial intelligence Logic in computer science Semantic Web

Publication details
- Publisher: Springer LNCS
- History: 2002–
- Frequency: annual (since 2002)

The annual International Web Rule Symposium (RuleML) is an international academic conference on research, applications, languages and standards for rule technologies. Since 2017 it is organised as International Joint Conference on Rules and Reasoning (RuleML+RR). It is a conference in the field of rule-based programming and rule-based systems including production rules systems, logic programming rule engines, and business rules engines/business rules management systems; Semantic Web rule languages and rule standards (e.g., RuleML, LegalRuleML, Reaction RuleML, SWRL, RIF, Common Logic, PRR, Decision Model and Notation (DMN), SBVR); rule-based event processing languages (EPLs) and technologies; and research on inference rules, constraint handling rules, transformation rules, decision rules, production rules, and ECA rules. RuleML+RR is the leading conference to build bridges between academia and industry in the field of Web rules and its applications, especially as part of the semantic technology stack. RuleML+RR is commonly listed together with other Artificial Intelligence conferences worldwide.

== History ==
The RuleML conference series has been held without interruption since 2002. The RuleML Symposium has evolved from an annual series of first international workshops since 2002, international conferences in 2005 and 2006, to the premier International Symposium for the Web rules community since 2007. Since 2017 it is joint with the Web Reasoning and Rule Systems conference series to the new International Joint Conference on Rules and Reasoning (RuleML+RR).

== International Rule Challenge ==
The International Rule Challenge has been held since 2007 at the RuleML Symposium. It calls for submissions of benchmarks/evaluations, demos, case studies / use cases, experience reports, best practice solutions (e.g. design patterns, reference architectures, models), rule-based implementations/ tools/ applications, demonstrations engineering methods, implementations of rule standards and industrial problem statements. It also hosts a rule base competition.

== RuleML Doctoral Consortium ==
Since 2011 the RuleML symposium organizes a Doctoral Consortium for PhD students.

Since 2017 also the Reasoning Web Summer Schools are co-located with the RuleML+RR conference.

== List of RuleML Editions ==
- RuleML+RR 2023: Seventh International Joint Conference on Rules and Reasoning
- RuleML+RR 2022: Sixth International Joint Conference on Rules and Reasoning
- RuleML+RR 2021: Fifth International Joint Conference on Rules and Reasoning
- RuleML-2015: Ninth International Web Rule Symposium
- Special Semantic Rules track at SemTech 2010
- RuleML-2005: First International Conference on Rules and Rule Markup Languages for the Semantic Web
- RuleML-2002: First International Workshop on Rule Markup Languages for Business Rules on the Semantic Web
