= Gradiant (foundation) =

Gradiant (Galician Research and Development Center in Advanced Telecommunications) is a private non-profit foundation working in the field of ICT, and the transference of R&D results into the private sector. The center's facilities are located in the city of Vigo and house the work of over one hundred researchers (20% of whom hold PhDs).

== History ==
Gradiant was first created by a group of lecturers at the School of Telecommunications Engineering (Escola de Enxeñaría de Telecomunicación), University of Vigo (Fernando Pérez-González, Javier González Castaño and Carlos Mosquera). In 2003, they started to discuss the possibility of creating a technological center. A viability study was carried out and presented to private companies working in the sector in Galicia and to the administration. The foundation was officially constituted in December 2007, with Fernando Pérez-González as executive director. Gradiant started operations in May 2008, in temporary facilities provided by the university. The philosophy was to combine the university's creativity and potential in the generation of ideas with the private sector's doctrines on efficiency.

== Board of Governors ==
The Centro Tecnolóxico de Telecomunicacións de Galicia (The Technological Center of Telecommunications of Galicia) was created by a board of governors including all three Galician universities (University of Vigo, University of Santiago and University of A Coruña) and ten companies in the telecommunications sector: Arantia, Arteixo Telecom, Egatel, Gsertel, Indra, R, Telefónica, Televés, Tredress, Vodafone and the cluster Ineo, which represents over 80 firms in the Galician ICT sector.

== Research areas ==
Gradiant’s philosophy is focused on a lateral, rather than a vertical approach to work, ruling the interaction between the three main work areas (digital communications, networks and applications, and multimodal information).

=== Data networks ===
Gradiant’s work in data networking includes traffic characterization and analysis, publication and distribution protocols for multimedia content and the design of multi-purpose integrated systems; the latter includes, among others, the internet of things, smart grid, and added value systems in vehicular platforms such as UAVs.

=== Service architectures ===
Gradiant is currently working on several technologies for the implementation of advanced applications, such as cloud technologies and other next generation paradigms, especially in connection with privacy and security, development platforms and analytical systems. In this field, Gradiant cooperates with key Spanish multinational companies. Research is also focusing on enhanced reality powered context-dependent information systems for training and technical management in industrial and hospital environments. Regarding the provision of services to network suppliers, Gradiant is working in the integration of heterogeneous services according to international standards. Finally, there is also much work being done in the field of business intelligence technologies (dashboards, patented algorithms for the in-memory compression of multidimensional databases, big data mining), equally in cooperation with important private firms. Gradiant’s substantial networking capacities facilitate the implementation of a multi-layered approach to global projects, guaranteeing optimal results.

=== Communication Subsystems ===
The skill of Gradiant’s staff in signal processing, programming languages, hardware, and analogical subsystems facilitate the in-house design, simulation and implementation of communication and data processing subsystems. This includes all stages in the implementation of communications subsystems as required by the specific case. The continued acquisition of new hardware and software has made possible novel validation laboratory tests, shortening the development times of new products. New communications standards, currently under development, are being followed while others are being put together within the center, such as RF/digital baseband direct conversion schemes, multi-antenna devices or location schemes

=== Management of radio resources ===
The use of radio spectrum and, most particularly, the coexistence of different services and the reuse of radio frequencies is one of Gradiant’s areas of interest. In this regard, the paradigm of cognitive radio generates conflicts of interest in bands such as UHF, traditionally assigned to television broadcasting. Among these we may highlight the monitoring of spectrum use, both for mobile and fixed services, and the development of databases for the real-time upgrading of spectrum status and availability. Equally, Gradiant is working on the development of new systems capable of making more efficient use of the spectrum, and also on the physical and access layers, specifically on the development of new devices with which the coverage of maritime and terrestrial communication systems can be extended. On the other hand, satellite communications continue to gain importance within Gradiant, with the development of projects in the field of S-bands and the participation in European proposals to extend the capabilities of current satellite communication systems.

=== Human Sensing ===
The main aim of this avenue of research is to use multiple sensors (video, audio, brain and other physiological signals) to model and understand human actions, behaviors and emotional states, while inferring useful information about the subject, such as identity, gender or age. The main research interests in this field are: multimodal biometrics (face, signature, voice), demographic estimates from facial features, analysis of human actions, and affective computing; that is, the analysis of emotional, cognitive and psychological states.

=== Multimedia Signal Processing ===
This research avenue approaches different aspects of multimedia data analysis and processing, most particularly regarding video, audio and 2D and depth images. This involves the combination of advanced real-time processing techniques with a good knowledge of current multimedia codification standards. The main focus is on the analysis of audio-visual material for data extraction, efficient processing through the use of graphic cards, the protection of multimedia data and the analysis of depth image for interaction with the environment. This research is also tackling image processing in mobile devices. The main fields of application include the interpretation of audio-visual content, video-monitoring, privacy-friendly data processing, document security, authentication and identification of multimedia contents and social television.
