= Legal Knowledge Interchange Format =

The Legal Knowledge Interchange Format (LKIF) was developed in the European ESTRELLA project and was designed with the goal of becoming a standard for representing and interchanging policy, legislation and cases, including their justificatory arguments, in the legal domain. LKIF builds on and uses the Web Ontology Language (OWL) for representing concepts and includes a reusable basic ontology of legal concepts. The core of LKIF consists of a combination of OWL-DL and SWRL.

LKIF was designed with two main roles in mind: the translation of legal knowledge bases written in different representation formats and formalisms and to be a knowledge representation formalism which could be part of larger architectures for developing legal knowledge systems.
