= Open frame =

Open frame and variants may refer to:

- Open frame (bowling), a ten-pin bowling term
- Open frame case, a desktop computing term
- Open frame (bicycle), a type of bicycle frame
- OpenFrame (TmaxSoft), a mainframe rehosting solution
- OpenFrame (OpenTrends), a Java development framework
- Open frame, a type of fuselage in aircraft

== See also ==
- Search: open frame
