= SWRL =

SWRL may refer to:

- Semantic Web Rule Language
- South West Rail Link, Australia
- South West Rugby League, England
