= R2ML =

The REWERSE Rule Markup Language (R2ML) is developed by the REWERSE Working Group I1 for the purpose of rules interchange between different systems and tools.

== Scope ==
- An XML based rule language;
- Support for: integrity rules, derivation rules, production rules and reaction rules;
- Integrate functional languages (such as OCL) with Datalog languages (such as SWRL);
- Serialization and interchange of rules by specific software tools;
- Integrating rule reasoning with actual server side technologies;
- Deploying, publishing and communicating rules in a network.

== Design principles ==
- Modeled using MDA;
- Rule concepts defined with the help of MOF/UML;
- Required to accommodate:
  - Web naming concepts, such as URIs and XML namespaces;
  - The ontological distinction between objects and data values;
  - The datatype concepts of RDF and user-defined datatypes;
- Actions (following OMG PRR submission);
- Events;
- EBNF abstract syntax;
- XML based concrete syntax validated by an XML Schema;
- Allowing different semantics for rules.

== See also ==
- Ontology (computer science)
- Business rules
- Business rules approach
- RuleML
- Semantic Web Rule Language
