= Business analysis =

Identifying and addressing business needs

Business analysis is a professional discipline focused on identifying business needs and determining solutions to business problems. Solutions may include a software systems development component, process improvements or organizational changes and may involve extensive analysis, strategic planning and policy development. A person dedicated to carrying out these tasks within an organization is called a business analyst or BA.

Business analysts are not limited to projects involving software system development. They may also collaborate across the organization, addressing business challenges alongside key stakeholders. Whilst most of the work that business analysts do today relates to software development / solutions, this is due to the ongoing massive changes businesses all over the world are experiencing in their attempts to digitise.

Although there are different role definitions, depending upon the organization, there does seem to be an area of common ground where most business analysts work. The responsibilities appear to be:

- To investigate business systems, taking a holistic view of the situation. This may include examining elements of the organisation structures and staff development issues as well as current processes and IT systems.
- To evaluate actions to improve the operation of a business system. Again, this may require an examination of organisational structure and staff development needs, to ensure that they are in line with any proposed process redesign and IT system development.
- To document the business requirements for the IT system support using appropriate documentation standards.

In line with this, the core business analyst role could be defined as an internal consultancy role that has the responsibility of investigating business situations, identifying and evaluating options for improving business systems, defining requirements, and ensuring the effective use of information systems in meeting the needs of the business.

== Sub-disciplines ==
Business analysis as a discipline includes requirements analysis, sometimes also called requirements engineering. It focuses on ensuring the changes made to an organisation are aligned with its strategic goals. These changes include changes to strategies, structures, policies, business rules, processes, and information systems.

Examples of business analysis include:

=== Enterprise analysis or company analysis ===
Focuses on understanding the needs of the business as a whole, its strategic direction, and identifying initiatives that will allow a business to meet those strategic goals. It also includes:

- Creating and maintaining the business architecture
- Conducting feasibility studies
- Identifying new business opportunities
- Scoping and defining new business opportunities
- Preparing the business case
- Conducting the initial risk assessment

=== Requirements planning and management ===
Involves planning on how the business analyst will go about gathering the requirement, in what order, using which techniques, which stakeholders, and the schedule that s/he will follow. Requirement management on the other hand involves the process business analyst will follow to maintain a finalized requirement up to date, including any requested changes in the requirements.

=== Requirements elicitation ===
Describes techniques for collecting requirements from stakeholders in a project. Techniques for requirements elicitation include:

- Brainstorming
- Document analysis
- Focus group
- Interface analysis
- Interviews/questionnaire
- Workshops
- Reverse engineering
- Surveys
- User task analysis
- Process mapping
- Observation/job shadowing
- Design thinking
- Prototyping

=== Requirements analysis and documentation ===
Describes how to develop and specify requirements in sufficient detail to allow them to be successfully implemented by a project team.

==== Analysis ====
The major forms of analysis are:

- Architecture analysis
- Business process analysis
- Object-oriented analysis
- Structured analysis
- Data warehouse analysis, storage and databases analysis

==== Documentation ====
Requirements documentation can take several forms:

- Textual – for example, stories that summarize specific information
- Matrix – for example, a table of requirements with priorities
- Diagrams – for example, how data flows from one structure to the other
- Wireframe – for example, how elements are required in a website,
- Models – for example, 3-D models that describes a character in a computer game

=== Requirements communication ===
Describes techniques for ensuring that stakeholders have a shared understanding of the requirements and how they will be implemented.

=== Solution assessment and validation ===
Describes how the business analyst can verify the correctness of a proposed solution, support the implementation of a solution, and assess possible shortcomings in the implementation.

== Techniques ==
There are a number of generic business techniques that a business analyst will use when facilitating business change.

Some of these techniques include:

=== PESTLE ===
This is used to perform an external environmental analysis by examining the many different external factors affecting an organization.

The six attributes of PESTLE:

- Political (current and potential influences from political pressures)
- Economic (the local, national and world economy impact)
- Sociological (the ways in which a society can affect an organization)
- Technological (the effect of new and emerging technology)
- Legal (the effect of national and world legislation)
- Environmental (the local, national and world environmental issues)

=== Heptalysis ===
This is used to perform an in-depth analysis of early stage businesses/ventures on seven important categories:

- Market opportunity
- Product/solution
- Execution plan
- Financial engine
- Human capital
- Potential return
- Margin of safety

=== STEER ===
It is essentially another take on PESTLE. It factors in the same elements of PESTLE and should not be considered a tool on its own except when an author/user prefers to use this acronym as opposed to PESTLE. STEER puts into consideration the following:

- Socio-cultural
- Technological
- Economic
- Ecological
- Regulatory factors

=== MOST ===
This is used to perform an internal environmental analysis by defining the attributes of MOST to ensure that the project you are working on is aligned to each of the four attributes.

The four attributes of MOST are:

- Mission (where the business intends to go)
- Objectives (the key goals which will help achieve the mission)
- Strategies (options for moving forward)
- Tactics (how strategies are put into action)

=== SWOT ===
A SWOT analysis is used to evaluate the Strengths, Weaknesses, Opportunities, and Threats of a business, or organisation. The analysis involves identifying and analysing the key internal and external factors that impact the organisation’s ability to achieve its goals and objectives.

The four attributes of SWOT analysis are:

- Strengths – What are the advantages? What is currently done well? (e.g. key area of best-performing activities of the company)
- Weaknesses – What should be improved? What is there to overcome? (e.g. key area where one is performing unsatisfactorily)
- Opportunities – What good opportunities face the organization? (e.g. key area where competitors are performing poorly)
- Threats – What obstacles does the organization face? (e.g. key area where competitors will perform well)

=== CATWOE ===
This is used to prompt thinking about what the business is trying to achieve. Business perspectives help the business analyst to consider the impact of any proposed solution on the people involved.

There are six elements of CATWOE:

- Customers – who are the beneficiaries of the highest level business process and how does the issue affect them?
- Actors – who is involved in the situation, who will be involved in implementing solutions and what will impact their success?
- Transformation process – what processes or systems are affected by the issue?
- Worldview – what is the big picture and what are the wider impacts of the issue?
- Owner – who owns the process or situation being investigated and what role will they play in the solution?
- Environmental constraints – what are the constraints and limitations that will impact the solution and its success?

=== de Bono's Six Thinking Hats ===
This is often used in a brainstorming session to generate and analyse ideas and options. It is useful to encourage specific types of thinking and can be a convenient and symbolic way to request someone to "switch gears". It involves restricting the group to only thinking in specific ways – giving ideas and analysis in the "mood" of the time. Also known as the Six Thinking Hats.

- White: pure facts, logical.
- Green: creative.
- Yellow: bright, optimistic, positive.
- Black: negative, devil's advocate.
- Red: emotional.
- Blue: cold, control.

Not all colors/moods have to be used.

=== Five whys ===
Five whys is used to get to the root of what is really happening in a single instance. For each answer given, a further 'why' is asked.

=== MoSCoW ===
This is used to prioritize requirements by allocating an appropriate priority, gauging it against the validity of the requirement itself and its priority against other requirements.

MoSCoW comprises:

- Must have – or else delivery will be a failure
- Should have – otherwise will have to adopt a workaround
- Could have – to increase delivery satisfaction
- Won't have this time – useful to the exclude requirements from this delivery timeframe

=== VPEC-T ===
This technique is used when analyzing the expectations of multiple parties having different views of a system in which they all have an interest in common, but have different priorities and different responsibilities.

- Values – constitute the objectives, beliefs and concerns of all parties participating. They may be financial, social, tangible and intangible
- Policies – constraints that govern what may be done and the manner in which it may be done
- Events – real-world proceedings that stimulate activity
- Content – the meaningful portion of the documents, conversations, messages, etc. that are produced and used by all aspects of business activity
- Trust – between users of the system and their right to access and change information within it

=== SCRS ===
The SCRS approach in business analysis claims that the analysis should flow from the high-level business strategy to the solution, through the current state and the requirements. SCRS stands for:

- Strategy
- Current state
- Requirements
- Solution

=== Business Analysis Canvas ===
The Business Analysis Canvas is a tool that enables business analysts to quickly present a high level view of the activities that will be completed as part of the business analysis work allocation. The Business Analysis Canvas is broken into several sections.

- Project objective
- Stakeholder
- Deliverable
- Impact to target operating model
- Communication approach
- Responsibilities
- Scheduling
- Key dates

The Canvas has activities and questions the business analyst can ask the organization to help build out the content.

=== Business Process Analysis ===
Processes are modeled visually to understand the current state and the models appear in levels to understand the enablers that are influencing a particular businesses process. At the highest level of the models are end-to-end business processes that would be common to many businesses. Below that business process level would be a level of activities, sub-activities and finally tasks. The task level is the most granular and when modeled depicts a particular workflow. As business processes get documented on the workflow level, they become more heavily influenced or "enabled" by characteristics that impact that particular businesses. These "workflow enablers" are considered to be workflow design, information systems/IT, motivation and measurement, human resources and organization, policies and rules, and facilities/physical environment. This technique of process leveling and analysis assists business analysts in understanding what is really required for a particular business and where there are possibilities to re-engineer a process for greater efficiency in the future state.

Business Process Analysis is a methodology which is used to examine organizational workflows to identify areas for improvement in efficiency, cost management, and productivity. By taking a step back to analyze the entire process from end to end, companies are able to identify areas of inefficiency that can be addressed to streamline operations. Process analysis is also a way to identify any redundancies or gaps in the process that can be eliminated or filled. With the right strategy and implementation, businesses are able to improve their organizational performance and save time and money. With the right tools, businesses can easily identify and address any issues in their processes and procedures, making them better equipped to respond to change and stay competitive.

=== BADIR ===
This is a framework that claims to help business analysts pursue an actionable analytic solution in five steps.[citation] BADIR stands for:

- Business question
- Analysis plan
- Data collection
- Insights
- Recommendations

== Roles of business analysts ==
As the scope of business analysis is very wide, there has been a tendency for business analysts to specialize in one of the three sets of activities which constitute the scope of business analysis. The primary role for business analysts is to identify business needs, define requirements, and provide solutions to business problems; these are done as a part of the following set of activities:

Strategist
Organizations need to focus on strategic matters on a more or less continuous basis in the modern business world. Business analysts serving this need are well-versed in analyzing the strategic profile of the organization and its environment, advising senior management on suitable policies, and the effects of policy decisions.

Architect
Organizations may need to introduce change to solve business problems which may have been identified by the strategic analysis, referred to above. Business analysts contribute by analyzing objectives, processes and resources, and suggesting ways by which re-design (BPR) or improvements (BPI) could be made. Particular skills of this type of analyst are "soft skills", such as knowledge of the business, requirements engineering, stakeholder analysis, and some "hard skills", such as business process modeling. Although the role requires an awareness of technology and its uses, it is not an IT-focused role.

Three elements are essential to this aspect of the business analysis effort: the redesign of core business processes; the application of enabling technologies to support the new core processes; and the management of organizational change. This aspect of business analysis is also called "business process improvement" (BPI), or "reengineering".

IT-systems analyst
There is the need to align IT development with the business system as a whole. A long-standing problem in business is how to get the best return from IT investments, which are generally very expensive and of critical, often strategic, importance. IT departments, aware of the problem, often create a business analyst role to better understand and define the requirements for their IT systems. Although there may be some overlap with the developer and testing roles, the focus is always on the IT part of the change process, and generally this type of business analyst gets involved only when a case for change has already been made and decided upon.

In any case, the term analyst is lately considered somewhat misleading, insofar as analysts (i.e. problem investigators) also do design work (solution definers).

The key responsibility areas of a business analyst are to collate the client's software requirements, understand them, and analyze them further from a business perspective. A business analyst is required to collaborate with and assist the business.

== Function within the organizational structure ==
The role of business analysis can exist in a variety of structures within an organizational framework. Because business analysts typically act as a liaison between the business and technology functions of a company, the role can be often successful either aligned to a line of business, within IT, or sometimes both.

Business alignment
When business analysts work at the business side, they are often subject matter experts for a specific line of business. These business analysts typically work solely on project work for a particular business, pulling in business analysts from other areas for cross-functional projects. In this case, there are usually business systems analysts on the IT side to focus on more technical requirements.

IT alignment
In many cases, business analysts work solely within IT and they focus on both business and systems requirements for a project, consulting with various subject matter experts (SMEs) to ensure thorough understanding. Depending on the organizational structure, business analysts may be aligned to a specific development lab or they might be grouped together in a resource pool and allocated to various projects based on availability and expertise. The former builds specific subject matter expertise while the latter provides the ability to acquire cross-functional knowledge.

Practice management
In a large organizations, there are centers of excellence or practice management groups who define frameworks and monitor the standards throughout the process of implementing the change in order to maintain the quality of change and reduce the risk of changes to organization. Some organizations may have independent centers of excellence for individual streams such as project management, business analysis or quality assurance.

A practice management team provides a framework by which all business analysts in an organization conduct their work, usually consisting of processes, procedures, templates and best practices. In addition to providing guidelines and deliverables, it also provides a forum to focus on continuous improvement of the business analysis function.

== Goals ==
Ultimately, business analysis wants to achieve the following outcomes:

- Create solutions
- Give enough tools for robust project management
- Improve efficiency and reduce waste
- Provide essential documentation, such as project initiation documents

One way to assess these goals is to measure the return on investment (ROI) for all projects. According to Forrester Research, more than $100 billion is spent annually in the U.S. on custom and internally developed software projects. For all of these software development projects, keeping accurate data is important and business leaders are constantly asking for the return or ROI on a proposed project or at the conclusion of an active project. However, asking for the ROI without sufficient data of where value is created or destroyed may result in inaccurate projections.

=== Reduce waste and complete projects on time ===
Project delays are costly in several ways:

- Project costs – for every month of delay, the project team costs and expenses continue to accumulate. When a large part of the development team has been outsourced, the costs will start to add up quickly and are very visible if contracted on a time and materials basis (T&M). Fixed price contracts with external parties limit this risk. For internal resources, the costs of delays are not as readily apparent, unless time spent by resources is being tracked against the project, as labor costs are essentially fixed costs.
- Opportunity costs – opportunity costs come in two types – lost revenue and unrealized expense reductions. Some projects are specifically undertaken with the purpose of driving new or additional revenues to the bottom line. For every month of delay, a company foregoes a month of this new revenue stream. The purpose of other projects is to improve efficiencies and reduce costs. Again, each month of failure postpones the realization of these expense reductions by another month. In the vast majority of cases, these opportunities are never captured or analyzed, resulting in misleading ROI calculations. Of the two opportunity costs, the lost revenue is the most egregious – and the effects are greater and longer lasting.

On a lot of projects (particularly larger ones) the project manager is the one responsible for ensuring that a project is completed on time. The BA's job is more to ensure that if a project is not completed on time then at least the highest priority requirements are met.

=== Document the right requirements ===
Business analysts want to make sure that they define the requirements in a way that meets the business needs, for example, in IT applications the requirements need to meet end-users' needs. Essentially, they want to define the right application. This means that they must document the right requirements through listening carefully to customer feedback, and by delivering a complete set of clear requirements to the technical architects and coders who will write the program. If a business analyst has limited tools or skills to help him elicit the right requirements, then the chances are fairly high that he will end up documenting requirements that will not be used or that will need to be re-written – resulting in rework as discussed below. The time wasted to document unnecessary requirements not only impacts the business analyst, it also impacts the rest of the development cycle. Coders need to generate application code to perform these unnecessary requirements and testers need to make sure that the wanted features actually work as documented and coded. Experts estimate that 10% to 40% of the features in new software applications are unnecessary or go unused. Being able to reduce the amount of these extra features by even one-third can result in significant savings. An approach of minimalism or keep it simple and minimum technology supports a reduced cost number for the result and on going maintenance of the implemented solution.

=== Improve project efficiency ===
Efficiency can be achieved in two ways: by reducing rework and by shortening project length.

Rework is a common industry headache and it has become so common at many organizations that it is often built into project budgets and time lines. It generally refers to extra work needed in a project to fix errors due to incomplete or missing requirements and can impact the entire software development process from definition to coding and testing. The need for rework can be reduced by ensuring that the requirements gathering and definition processes are thorough and by ensuring that the business and technical members of a project are involved in these processes from an early stage.

Shortening project length presents two potential benefits. For every month that a project can be shortened, project resource costs can be diverted to other projects. This can lead to savings on the current project and lead to earlier start times of future projects (thus increasing revenue potential).

== See also ==
- Cost overrun – Unexpected incurred costs in excess of budgeted amounts
- Data Presentation Architecture – Visual representation of data
- Enterprise Life Cycle – Process of changing an enterprise over time
- Operations research – Discipline concerning the application of advanced analytical methods
- Strategic management – Initiatives to enhance the performance of firms in external environments
- Real options valuation – Capital budgeting analysis term
- Requirements analysis – Engineering process
- Revenue shortfall – When the actual benefits of a venture are less than the projected or estimated benefits
- Spreadmart – Spreadsheet data mart
- Viability study
