= Semantic grid =

A semantic grid is an approach to grid computing in which information, computing resources and services are described using the semantic data model. In this model, the data and metadata are expressed through facts (small sentences), becoming directly understandable for humans. This makes it easier for resources to be discovered and combined automatically to create virtual organizations (VOs). The descriptions constitute metadata and are typically represented using the technologies of the Semantic Web, such as the Resource Description Framework (RDF).

Like the Semantic Web, the semantic grid can be defined as "an extension of the current grid in which information and services are given well-defined meaning, better enabling computers and people to work in cooperation."

This notion of the semantic grid was first articulated in the context of e-Science, observing that such an approach is necessary to achieve a high degree of easy-to-use and seamless automation, enabling flexible collaborations and computations on a global scale.

The use of semantic web and other knowledge technologies in grid applications are sometimes described as the knowledge grid. Semantic grid extends this by also applying these technologies within the grid middleware.

Some semantic grid activities are coordinated through the Semantic Grid Research Group of the Global Grid Forum.

== See also ==
- Business Intelligence 2.0
- LSID
- Semantic Web Rule Language
- Semantic Grid System - A CSS grid framework .
