= OpenFrame (TmaxSoft) =

- Developer: TmaxSoft
- Type: Mainframe rehosting
- License: Proprietary
- Website: www.tmaxsoft.com/products/openframe/

OpenFrame is an enterprise-grade mainframe rehosting solution developed by TmaxSoft. It aims to minimize changes to the existing business logic of assets in major global mainframe environments such as IBM, Fujitsu, and Hitachi, and to secure flexibility in IT infrastructure and recompiling and migrating mainframe assets to open systems and cloud environments. It is characterized by enabling a transition to modern architecture while preserving existing business logic and data.

== Mainframe Migration ==
Organizations that run on mainframes tend to have difficulty with costs and agility. Rehosting is one approach an organization may take to migrate their mainframe operations to the cloud, with other options including batch-job migration and full re-engineering. With the rehosting option, the entire mainframe is emulated on the cloud so that the end-user experience is essentially unchanged.

== History ==
Since its initial release in 2005, OpenFrame has expanded its functionality through the expansion of supported platforms and cloud optimization.

- v2 (released in 2005): This version provided the initial structure as a rehosting solution. It includes an online product based on the Tmax TP-Monitor and a batch system based on JCL (Job Control Language), and introduced the concept of DataSet and EBCDIC-ASCII migration functionality. In particular, it supports failover through multi-node online configuration and supports CICS TDQ and TSQ.
- v4 (released in 2007): Support platforms were expanded to HP-UX, Solaris, and Linux, and TACF, which is responsible for security functions, was separated into a standalone product. In addition, mainframe-level sorting utility functions were integrated through ProSort.
- v5 (released in 2008): Support for target mainframe platforms was expanded in earnest. In addition to existing IBM products, support for Fujitsu and Hitachi mainframes (Batch) began, and AIX 5 and IA64 Linux environments were additionally supported.
- v7 (released in 2016): It was completely reorganized with the goal of processing large-scale systems optimized for cloud environments. It moved away from dependence on external compilers and began supporting its own compilers (OFCOBOL, OFPLI, OFASM). To improve performance, the existing dataset management method was improved to a DBMS lock-based approach, and the ODBC method, a standard for DB access, was introduced.

== Features ==
- Support for multi-vendor environments: Supports various mainframe operating systems such as IBM as well as Fujitsu MSP/XSP and Hitachi VOS3.
- Rehosting technology (No-rewrite): Through compiler technology, legacy languages such as COBOL, PL/I, and Assembler preserve core business logic, and run in open system environments by minimizing source code modification due to environmental differences.
- Mainframe workload replication: Provides the same business execution environment as existing mainframes through dedicated engines for online transaction processing (CICS, IMS/DC, AIM, DCCM3) and batch processing (Batch).
- Data infrastructure modernization: Automatically converts VSAM and legacy hierarchical/network data into standard RDBMS (Tibero, Oracle, etc.) to improve data usability.
- Integrated management and visibility (OFManager): Through OFManager, a web-based GUI tool, it provides integrated control of engine status monitoring, job management, and security policy configuration.

== Architecture ==
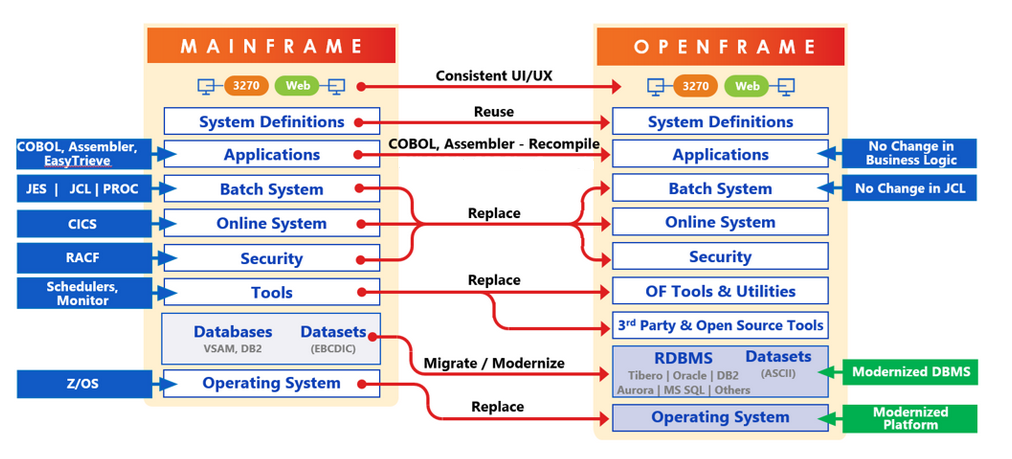
Solution architecture of OpenFrame 7.0 (click to enlarge)

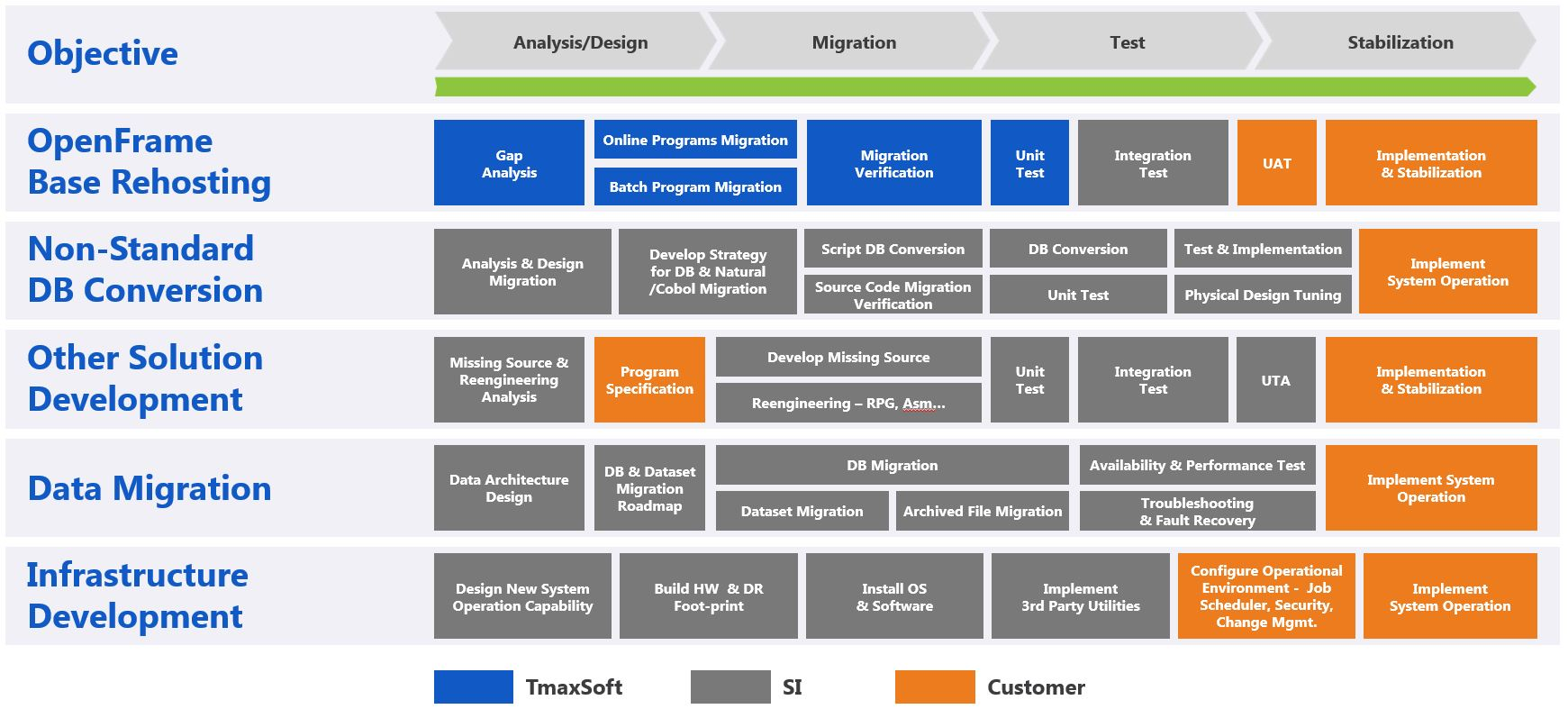
OpenFrame 7.0 implementation methodology (click to enlarge)

OpenFrame supports the transition to flexible open systems and cloud environments while preserving the core assets of existing mainframes. Each system layer is transitioned through the following strategies:

Migration Architecture

- User interface and system definition (Reuse): Maintains existing 3270 terminals and web environments as they are to provide a consistent UI/UX to users. In addition, risks during the transition process are minimized by reusing system definitions
- Application and business logic (Recompile): Core languages such as COBOL and Assembler are accommodated through recompilation, maintaining continuity of business logic (No Change in Business Logic).
- Batch and online systems (Replace with Compatibility): Core mainframe engines such as JES, CICS, IMS/DC, AIM, and DCCM3 are replaced with OpenFrame-specific engines. In this process, batch jobs can be executed without modification to JCL (No Change in JCL).
- Security and management tools (Replace): Security systems such as RACF are replaced with OpenFrame-specific security (TACF) and utilities, and management tools such as OFManager are provided to maintain mainframe-level management performance in open environments.
- Database and datasets (Migrate & Modernize): EBCDIC-based data and legacy databases such as VSAM and IMS/DB are modernized into standard ASCII and open RDBMS such as Tibero and Oracle. Through this, data usability can be improved and a modern data ecosystem can be established.
- Operating system (Modernized Platform): The closed z/OS environment is replaced with modern open platforms such as Linux, Unix, and cloud-based environments, with the goal of reducing operating costs and improving efficiency.

Online

The online architecture of OpenFrame focuses on reproducing the mainframe Region concept as independent environments on open systems.

- Dedicated engines by platform: Provides OSC corresponding to IBM CICS, OSI for IMS/DC, and dedicated environments corresponding to Fujitsu AIM and Hitachi DCCM3.
- Transaction processing: Operates based on the Tmax TP-Monitor and supports large-scale transaction processing and process management.
- Interface preservation: Supports existing commands and interfaces such as EXEC CICS, DL/I, and PSAM without modification, and maintains existing screen environments as they are through BMS/MFS/XMAP functions.

Batch

The batch architecture implements the job control method and scheduling principles of mainframes in the same way on open systems.

- TJES (Tmax Job Entry Subsystem): A core system corresponding to the mainframe JES, which executes existing batch jobs written in JCL (Job Control Language) without modification.
- Support for multiple OS types: Implements platform-specific JCL syntax and scheduling principles for IBM MVS, Fujitsu MSP/XSP, and Hitachi VOS3.
- Execution environment optimization: Controls the entire process from job submission to result output through Runner, Spool, and Output management functions.

Database

The core of the data architecture is to modernize legacy data structures into standard relational databases (RDBMS).

- Dataset and character set conversion: Processes Non-VSAM and VSAM files, and converts EBCDIC character sets to ASCII or UTF-8 to provide compatibility with open environments.
- Structural transformation layer (TSAM/HiDB/NDB): Automatically converts complex legacy databases such as VSAM (indexed files), IMS (hierarchical), and AIM/DB (network) into standard SQL-based RDBMS tables such as Tibero and Oracle.
- Standardization of access methods: Preserves application logic by converting existing program navigational methods or DL/I calls into SQL queries in real time.

== Components ==
Category	Product	Main Role
Base System	BASE	Handles data structure compatibility and EBCDIC-ASCII conversion processing
Online Engine	OSC, OSI, AIM, OSD, OFGW	Provides transaction services (corresponding to CICS, IMS/DC, AIM, DCCM3)
Batch Engine	Batch	Implements platform-specific JCL syntax and scheduling
Security Solution	TACF	Provides user authentication and access control inheriting existing RACF security settings
Compiler	OFCOBOL, OFPLI, OFASM	Supports recompilation of legacy source code and interoperability with other languages
Utility	ProSort, ProTrieve	Provides data sorting (SORT) and Easytrieve replacement interpreter
Management Software	OFManager	Provides GUI-based integrated monitoring and control of core systems (Batch, Online, etc.)

OpenFrame provides a suite of products based on a consistent system in order to fully reproduce the infrastructure and execution environment of mainframes on open systems.

Data Modernization and Base Modules (Base & Data Modernization)

- Base: A core module that migrates the data area to a Linux/Unix-based environment. It supports various dataset types such as VSAM and Non-VSAM, and ensures data compatibility across heterogeneous environments through character set (EBCDIC-ASCII) conversion.
- TSAM (Tmax VSAM): Automatically converts existing indexed and sequential file data into relational database (RDBMS) tables. It converts the application’s data access methods into SQL-based processing in real time.
- HiDB (Hierarchical DB): Converts IBM IMS hierarchical databases into RDBMS, and maintains program compatibility by mapping DL/I-based data calls to SQL queries.
- NDB (Network DB): Modernizes network-type databases such as Fujitsu AIM/DB and Hitachi XDM/SD into RDBMS. It converts existing navigational access methods into standardized SQL-based methods.

Online and Batch Execution Engines (Service Engines)

Executes the inherent business processing logic of mainframes on open systems.

- Online (OSC, OSI, AIM, OSD): Provides platform-specific online transaction processing environments (CICS, IMS, AIM, DCCM3, etc.) based on independent regions. It processes large-scale transactions based on the Tmax TP-Monitor and supports existing screen control functions such as BMS, MFS, and XMAP as they are.
- Batch & TJES: Executes batch jobs without JCL modification through TJES, which corresponds to the mainframe Job Entry Subsystem (JES). It implements the unique batch execution principles and scheduling environments of IBM, Fujitsu, and Hitachi.

Security, Management, and Utilities (Security & Management)

Maintains the security of the entire system and supports a GUI-based integrated operation environment.

- TACF: A security solution corresponding to the mainframe RACF, performing user authentication and resource access control. It supports SAF_EXIT to integrate customer-specific security policies.
- OFManager: A web-based GUI integrated management tool. It monitors and controls all core systems of OpenFrame, such as Batch, Online, and databases, in real time from a single interface.
- Support Utilities (ProSort, ProTrieve): Replaces mainframe-specific utilities such as SORT and Easytrieve. It supports high-performance sorting operations and interpreter-based program execution without source code modification.

== Notable Users ==
=== GE Capital ===
GE Capital opted to use OpenFrame to modernize its aging IT infrastructure, which was mostly made up of mainframes. Before rehosting, the GE Capital system was managing 5 million account schedules, over 382 interfaces, with up to 1,700 concurrent users, resulting in an average of 3.5 million transactions per day. In addition to high costs, the disaster recovery process was slow and the system was generally inefficient. OpenFrame allowed GE Capital to rehost without redeveloping any applications or changing the user interface. The results included 66% reduction in costs associated with running the system and a 240% increase in disaster recovery speed.

=== FWD ===
FWD Life Insurance of Japan evaluated the adoption of a new infrastructure due to rising costs associated with mainframe vendor dependence, increasing system complexity, and declining vendor support. The company migrated its policy administration system, which had been in operation since 1996, to a Microsoft Azure environment using TmaxSoft’s OpenFrame solution. The need for this transition was identified around 2017, followed by a review process beginning in late 2018. The migration was completed in March 2023. The project was carried out using a replatforming approach, in which the existing applications were retained while the underlying environment was changed.

=== SC Data Center ===
SC Data Center, Inc. migrated six core business systems from an IBM mainframe environment to Amazon Web Services (AWS). The existing mainframe environment faced challenges in meeting increasing performance demands, offered limited flexibility in responding to market changes and customer requirements, and incurred high infrastructure costs.

As a result, the organization pursued a cloud transition and adopted a mainframe modernization approach that preserved existing application assets rather than rewriting them. In this process, TmaxSoft’s OpenFrame was used to migrate thousands of COBOL and assembly programs, along with middleware and batch processes, to the AWS environment.

=== Entergy ===
Entergy Corporation, a U.S.-based energy company, had operated a mainframe system introduced in 1981. Due to rising maintenance costs and continued reliance on mission-critical applications, the company initiated an infrastructure transition.

Entergy migrated its mainframe environment to a Linux-based virtual server environment using a replatforming approach that preserved existing applications. In this process, OpenFrame and Tibero were applied, and program recompilation along with data and file system migration was carried out.

=== Safran ===
Safran Aircraft Engines, a French aerospace company, had been phasing out its IBM mainframe over more than 20 years, but several critical applications remained in operation. These applications were complex and could not be easily rewritten, while the mainframe support contract was nearing its end.

To address this, the company adopted a rehosting approach that preserved existing applications while migrating them to a new environment. OpenFrame was used to transfer applications, including those based on assembler and IMS databases, without modification.
