= Business intelligence 2.0 =

Business intelligence 2.0 (BI 2.0) is a development of the existing business intelligence model that began in the mid-2000s, where data can be obtained from many sources. The process allows for querying real-time corporate data by employees but approaches the data with a web browser-based solution. This is in contrast to previous proprietary querying tools that characterized previous BI software.

== Overview ==
The growth in service-oriented architectures (SOA) is one of the main factors for the development of BI 2.0, which is intended to be more flexible and adaptive than normal business intelligence. Data exchange processes also differ, with XBRL (Extensible Business Reporting Language), web services, and various Semantic Web ontologies enabling the use of data external to an organization, such as benchmarking-type information. In addition, BI 2.0 facilitates the integration of real-time data, allowing businesses to react to market changes more swiftly than traditional systems. This has made BI 2.0 particularly valuable in industries requiring rapid decision-making, such as finance and e-commerce.

Business intelligence 2.0 is believed to have been named after Web 2.0, although it takes elements from both Web 2.0 (a focus on user empowerment and community collaboration, technologies like RSS, and the concept of mashups), and the Semantic Web, sometimes called "Web 3.0" (semantic integration through shared ontologies to enable easier exchange of data).

According to analytics expert Neil Raden, BI 2.0 also implies a move away from the standard data warehouse that business intelligence tools have used, which "will give way to context, contingency, and the need to relate information quickly from many sources."

== See also ==
- Enterprise bookmarking
- Linked data – Structured data and method for its publication
- Object-based – Type of programming language
- Ontology alignment – Process of determining correspondences between concepts in ontologies
- Relationship extraction
- Semantic grid
- Semantic Web Rule Language – Language to express rules and logic with semantic web (SWRL)
- Semantic wiki – Wiki that implements semantic web
- Spreadmart – Spreadsheet data mart
- Synonym ring – Data about other data

=== People ===
- Don Tapscott – Canadian businessman (born 1947)
- David Weinberger – American philosopher (1950-)
