= Televés =

Spanish radio antenna company

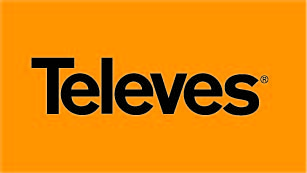
Televés logo

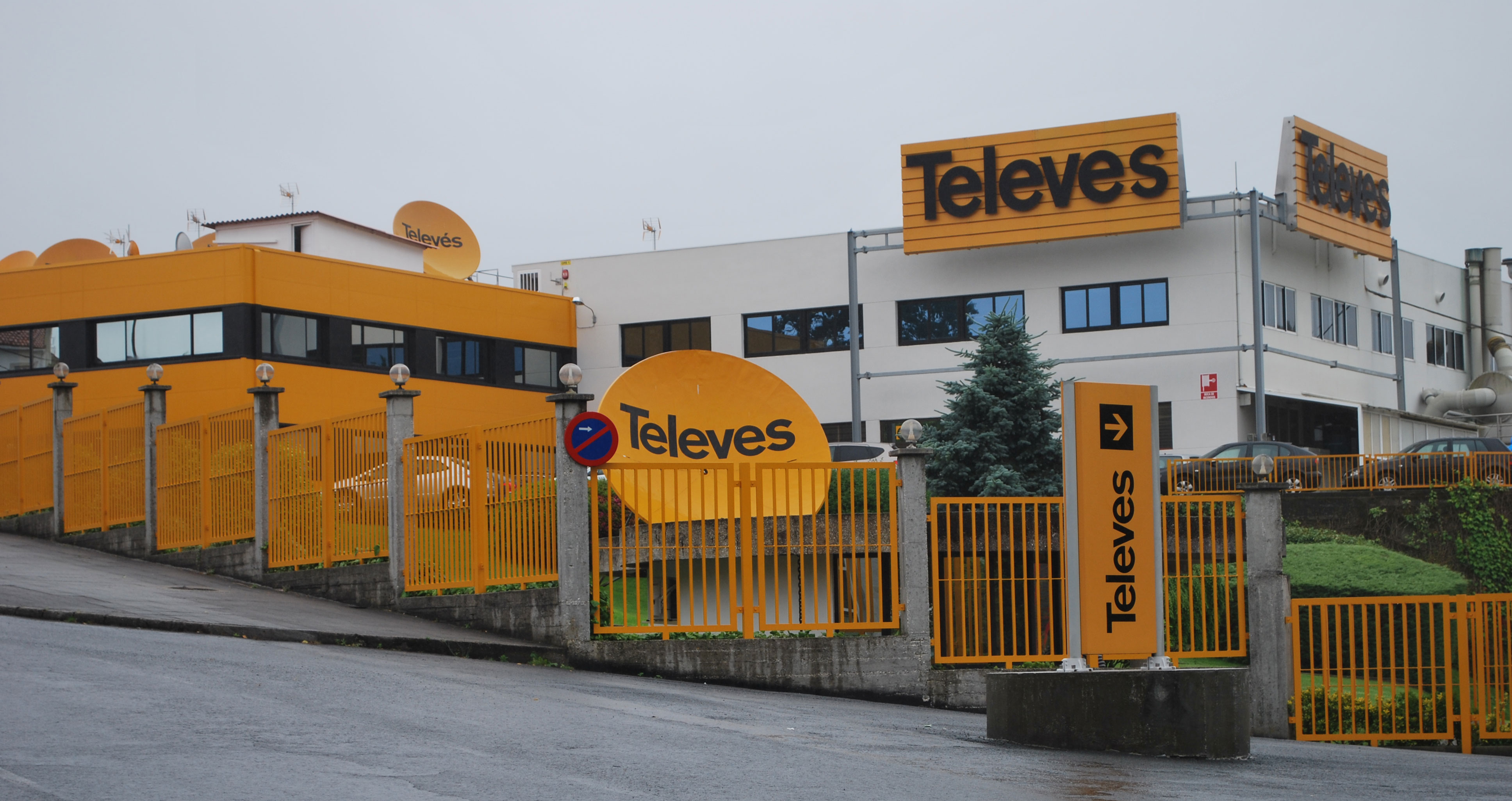
Televés building in Conxo

Televés S.A.U. is a Spanish manufacturer of telecommunications equipment for both commercial buildings and homes. The company specializes in the reception and distribution of radio and television signals.

Founded in 1958, Televés was originally an antenna manufacturing workshop. Its founders were Ricardo Bescansa, Amador Beiras, and Domingo Carrascal. Its headquarters are located in Santiago de Compostela. Since its founding, Televés has diversified its business to include: professional lighting with LED technology; audiovisual services via fiber optic and wireless networks for hotels and buildings in the hospitality industry; and wavelength-division multiplexing for the Spanish healthcare sector.

Televés is a multinational corporation composed of about twenty companies, as well as 11 international subsidiaries in Portugal, France, the United Kingdom, Italy, Germany, Poland, Scandinavia, Russia, the United States, China, and the United Arab Emirates. Through a distributor network, the company delivers its products to more than 100 countries on five continents. In 1995, Televés joined the DVB, an international consortium of companies that promotes digital television technology standards.

== Business model ==
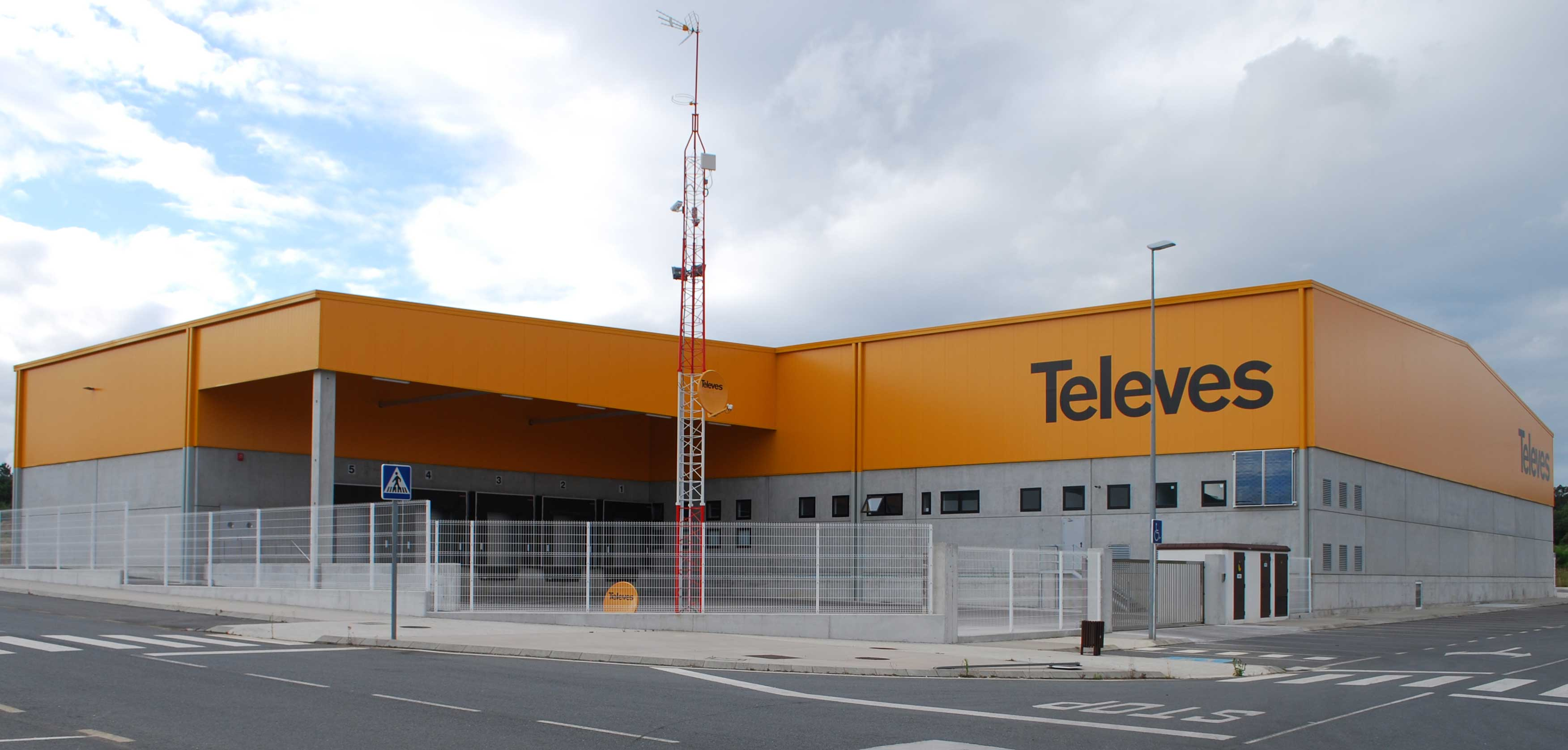
Logistics center in Oroso.

The Televés brand is closely linked to satellite dishes painted in the characteristic corporate orange color, which corresponds to Pantone 137C or RAL 1007. In this sense, Televés has been the first Spanish company to obtain a color trademark, being the exclusive user of this color in terrestrial antennas. In July 2013, one of these antennas became part of the collection of the National Museum of Science and Technology at its headquarters in A Coruña.

In 2014, Televés entered the health care sector, with the development of a product line for the care of elderly and dependent people along with a project to develop a smart room for the Galician Healthcare Service.
