= Viability study =

A Viability study is an in depth investigation of the profitability of the business idea to be converted into a business enterprise.

== Feasibility report ==
This type of report studies a situation (for example, a problem or opportunity) and the plan for doing something about it, then determines whether that plan is "feasible". This would involve determining whether it is technologically possible to achieve and whether it is practical in the current technological, economical and social scenario. The feasibility report does not provide a simple "Yes" or "No" answer, but is used in the analysis of a decision. It is not just a tool to provide a recommendation, it is also used to gather data and give reasoning behind the recommendation given, to be later used in evaluation.

This study is the most important especially to people who plan to start their own business.

== Recommendation report ==
This type of report examines either a stated need or a selection of choices, or in some cases both. The report is a collection of analysis and evaluation of the situation, and generally will examine the strengths and weaknesses, opportunities and threats in the situation, take them into account, and be combined with the feasibility report in order to give a recommendation. Sometimes a recommendation can be given to do nothing, if all options currently possible would prove unbeneficial. The recommendation report answers the question "Which option should we choose?" (or "Which are the best options?") by allowing a recommendation to be made. This can be linked into the analysis of the continuum of choice in the scenario.

== Evaluation report ==
This type of report provides an opinion or judgment rather that is based on the above two report, along with additional data available. It provides a studied opinion on the value or worth of something. This type of report compares the object of the analysis to a set of requirements (or criteria) and determines how well it meets those requirements. Generally, the evaluation report will feature an overall recommendation on the course of action to be taken.
