= Semantic Web Rule Language =

Language to express rules and logic with semantic web

The Semantic Web Rule Language (SWRL) is a proposed language for the Semantic Web that can be used to express rules as well as logic, combining OWL DL or OWL Lite with a subset of the Rule Markup Language (itself a subset of Datalog).

The specification was submitted in May 2004 to the W3C by the National Research Council of Canada, Network Inference (since acquired by webMethods), and Stanford University in association with the Joint US/EU ad hoc Agent Markup Language Committee. The specification was based on an earlier proposal for an OWL rules language.

SWRL has the full power of OWL DL, but at the price of decidability and practical implementations. However, decidability can be regained by restricting the form of admissible rules, typically by imposing a suitable safety condition.

Rules are of the form of an implication between an antecedent (body) and a consequent (head). The intended meaning can be read as: whenever the conditions specified in the antecedent hold, then the conditions specified in the consequent must also hold. Both the antecedent and the consequent are composed of conjunctions of atoms. The basic atom forms are:

- C(x) — a class description atom, asserting that individual x belongs to class C
- P(x, y) — a property atom, asserting that individual x is related to individual y (or a data value) by property P
- sameAs(x, y) and differentFrom(x, y) — identity atoms

The specification notes that the sameAs and differentFrom atoms do not increase the expressivity of the language, since OWL together with rules (without these atoms) is already capable of the same expressions.

== Example ==
=== Human Readable Syntax ===
hasParent(?x1,?x2) ∧ hasBrother(?x2,?x3) ⇒ hasUncle(?x1,?x3)

=== XML Concrete Syntax ===
The XML Concrete Syntax is a combination of the OWL Web Ontology Language XML Presentation Syntax with the RuleML XML syntax.

 <ruleml:imp> 
  <ruleml:_rlab ruleml:href="#example1"/>
  <ruleml:_body> 
    <swrlx:individualPropertyAtom  swrlx:property="hasParent"> 
      <ruleml:var>x1</ruleml:var>
      <ruleml:var>x2</ruleml:var>
    </swrlx:individualPropertyAtom> 
    <swrlx:individualPropertyAtom  swrlx:property="hasBrother"> 
      <ruleml:var>x2</ruleml:var>
      <ruleml:var>x3</ruleml:var>
    </swrlx:individualPropertyAtom> 
  </ruleml:_body> 
  <ruleml:_head> 
    <swrlx:individualPropertyAtom  swrlx:property="hasUncle"> 
      <ruleml:var>x1</ruleml:var>
      <ruleml:var>x3</ruleml:var>
    </swrlx:individualPropertyAtom> 
  </ruleml:_head> 
 </ruleml:imp>

=== RDF Concrete Syntax ===
It is straightforward to provide such an RDF concrete syntax for rules, but the presence of variables in rules goes beyond the RDF Semantics. Translation from the XML Concrete Syntax to RDF/XML could be easily accomplished by extending the XSLT transformation for the OWL XML Presentation syntax.

== Implementations ==
Caveat: Reasoners do not support the full specification because the reasoning becomes undecidable. There can be three types of approach:

1. translate SWRL into First Order Logic (Hoolet) and demonstrate reasoning tasks with a theorem prover;
2. translate OWL-DL into rules and give the rules to a forward chaining engine (Bossam) (this approach cannot cover the full expressivity of OWL-DL due to many incompatibilities between Description Logic and Horn Rule formalisms)
3. expand an existing OWL-DL reasoner based on the tableaux algorithm (Pellet).
4. Protégé 4.2 includes a Rules view in its Ontology Views that supports SWRL rules.
5. For older versions of Protégé, SWRLTab is an extension that supports editing and execution of SWRL rules.
6. R2ML (REWERSE Rule Markup Language) supports SWRL.
7. Bossam, a forward chaining rule engine supports SWRL.
8. Hoolet, an implementation of an OWL-DL reasoner that uses a first order prover supports SWRL.
9. Pellet, an open-source Java OWL DL reasoner has SWRL-support.
10. KAON2 is an infrastructure for managing OWL-DL, SWRL, and F-Logic ontologies.
11. RacerPro, supports the processing of rules in a SWRL-based syntax by translating them into nRQL rules
12. Stardog is an RDF database or triplestore that rewrites queries to answer questions using SWRL inferences.

	Bossam	Hoolet	Pellet
SWRL/OWLX Parser	Yes	?	?
SWRL/RDF Parser	Yes	?	Yes
Math Built-Ins	Partial	?	Yes
String Built-Ins	Partial	?	Yes
Comparison Built-Ins	?	?	Yes
Boolean Built-Ins	?	?	Yes
Date, Time and Duration Built-Ins	?	?	No
URI Built-Ins	?	?	Yes
Lists Built-Ins	?	?	No
Licensing	Free/closed-source	Free/open-source	Free/open-source

== Comparison with Description Logic Programs ==
Description Logic Programs (DLPs) are another proposal for integrating rules and OWL. Compared with Description Logic Programs, SWRL takes a diametrically opposed integration approach. DLP is the intersection of Horn logic and OWL, whereas SWRL is (roughly) the union of them. In DLP, the resultant language is a very peculiar looking description logic and rather inexpressive language overall.

== See also ==
- Description Logic
- Web Ontology Language - "OWL"
- Datalog (query and rule language)
- Semantic Web
- Semantic Grid
- Ontology (information science)
- Business Intelligence 2.0 (BI 2.0)
- Semantic wiki
