= Simon Mulongo =

Ugandan politician

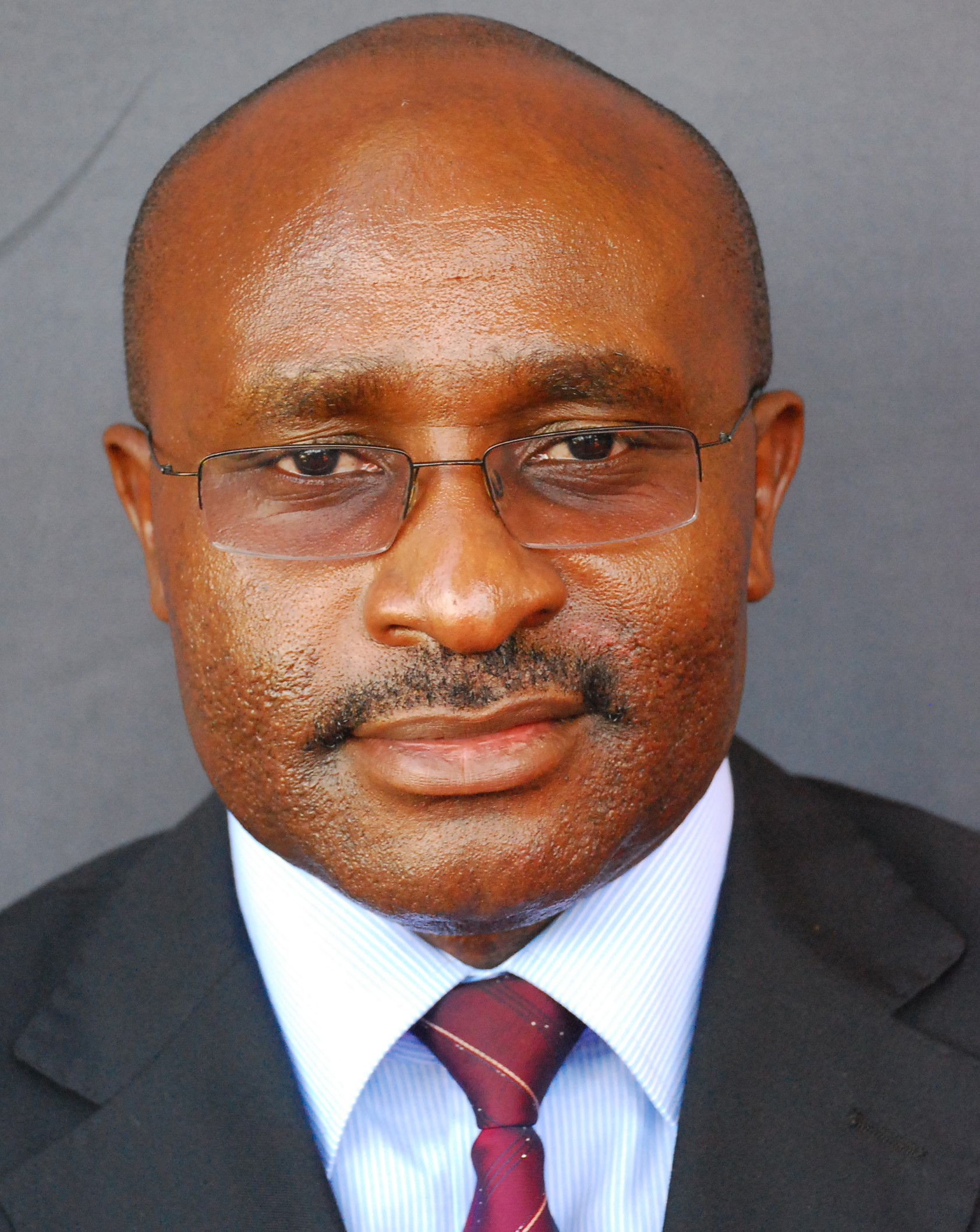

Honorable

Personal details
- Born: Simon Mulongo; 26 June 1962 (age 64) Manafwa, Uganda
- Education: IAC (Bachelor of Accountancy); Fairfax University (MBA); University of Nairobi (MA International Relations)
- Occupation: Security consultant, politician
- Known for: International relations, Politics

Simon Mulongo (born 26 June 1962) is a Ugandan financial advisor, international relations specialist, security consultant and politician. He is the former member of parliament and CA delegate for Bubulo County East, Bugisu sub-region and is a member of National Resistance Movement (NRM), the ruling political party in Uganda.

He represented the constituents of Bubulo County East in the 9th Parliament and as a member of the Constituent Assembly that promulgated the 1995 Constitution of the Republic of Uganda. In Parliament, he served as the vice chairperson of the Committee on Defence and Internal Affairs and as a member of the Committee on Rules, Privileges and Discipline.

== Early life and education ==
Mulongo was born in Bubulo Parish, Bugisu sub-region, on 26 June 1962 in a Christian family of the Bagisu. He had his primary education in his home town of Mbale and attained his PLE certification in 1978.

He then attended Nkoma Senior Secondary School for his O-Level education and A-Level education, attaining a UCE certification in 1982 and a UACE certification in 1985.

Mulongo further advanced to the Institute of Accounting and Commerce (IAC) where he attained a diploma in accountancy in 1988 and became a certified public and company accountant in 1989. He then attended Fairfax University, graduating in 1992 with a Master of Business Administration. In 2005, he graduated with an MA in Strategy/Conflict Resolution from the National Defence College, Kenya (NDCK). Additionally, he attained an MA in International Relations from the University of Nairobi in 2007.

== Career and politics ==
Mulongo started his professional and political career in 1994 as a member of the Constituent Assembly that promulgated the 1995 Constitution of the Republic of Uganda. From 1996 to 2001, he was appointed by the president to serve as a resident district commissioner (RDC), representing the central government and chairing security committees in the districts of Jinja, Luwero and Hoima.

In 2001, he secured employment as a policy analyst in the Office of the President, a position he held up until 2003 when he was promoted to the role of director, strategic policy. In 2007, Mulongo became the director of Eastern Africa Standby Force Coordination Mechanism (EASFCOM) for a two-year spell after which he officially joined elective politics.

In 2009, Mulongo joined elective politics on the National Resistance Movement ticket and strategized for the 2011 polls, a move that saw him win both the party's 2010 primary elections and the 2011 general elections thereby becoming a member of the 9th Parliament for the Pearl of Africa representing Bubulo County East in Manafwa District. In the 9th Parliament, Mulongo served as the vice chairperson of the Committee on Defence and Internal Affairs and as a member of the Committee on Rules, Privileges and Discipline and the NRM Parliamentary Caucus.

In 2016, Mulongo failed in his reelection bid and now continues to work as a partner at Link Conflict Consultants (LICCO), a firm he co-founded in 2009 and as security analyst at EMANS Frontiers.

== Personal details ==
Mulongo is a married man with a number of children. He is also the founder of Link Conflict Consultants (LICCO), a security consultancy firm in Uganda.

== Interviews and Op-eds ==
- NRM Now Boasts of New Historicals, Says Mulongo
- Clottey interview with Simon Mulongo, leading Uganda parliament official
- Clottey interview with Simon Mulongo, legislator from Uganda's ruling Uganda NRM party

== See also ==
- Manafwa District
- National Resistance Movement
- Parliament of Uganda
