= Backward chaining (applied behavior analysis) =

Behavior analysis technique

Chaining is a technique used in applied behavior analysis to teach complex tasks by breaking them down into discrete responses or individual behaviors that are part of a task analysis. Backward chaining is a type of chaining in which a sequence of steps is taught beginning with the last step and adding previous steps as each is mastered. In a backward chaining procedure, the teacher may complete all the steps for the learner and provide the learner the opportunity to attempt the final step. Alternatively, the adult may guide the learner through each step and allow the learner to complete the final step independently. If the learner is unable to independently complete the final step, the teacher will provide prompts and deliver reinforcement upon completion. The reinforcement consistently being delivered for finishing the task may help to maintain the learner's motivation. Because independence is desired the goal is to remove the prompts as soon as the learner can complete the steps without help.

== Task Analysis ==
A task analysis involves breaking a complex skill into smaller, teachable units creating a series of steps. In backward chaining, it is used to identify the sequence of steps so the final response may be targeted first.

== Procedure ==
In backward chaining, a task is first broken down into individual steps using a task analysis. The teacher begins by completing all but the final step of the task, allowing the learner to complete it independently.

Once this step is mastered, the preceding step is introduced and this process follows until the task is fully mastered. The teacher may provide prompts at any step to ensure correct responses, however the prompts must be systematically removed to ensure independence and mastery.

== Example ==
In handwashing, the instructor completes all steps of the task for the learner up to the final step, such as turning off the faucet. Once the learner can perform the final step independently, the instructor then teaches the preceding step, such as drying hands. This process continues until the learner can independently perform the entire task.

== Application ==
Backward chaining is commonly used in applied behavior analysis to teach complex skills. Some examples of functional skills taught with this procedure are washing hands, brushing teeth, dressing, cooking, and cleaning. It can also be used to develop communication methods, like the Picture Exchange Communication System.

Research shows that backward chaining is an effective way to help individuals with developmental disabilities learn multi-step tasks. While some studies compare forward and backward chaining, there is no conclusive evidence to show that learners prefer one method over the other. Preference is usually up to the specific individuals who are teaching or being taught the intervention.

== Research ==
Backward chaining is primarily studied in applied behavior analysis to evaluate its effectiveness in teaching multi-step tasks. Research shows that individuals with developmental disabilities learn functional skills successfully with this method. Studies comparing backward chaining with forward chaining show both as effective methods of learning.

== Advantages and Limitations ==
An advantage of backward chaining is that the learner immediately accesses reinforcement for completing the task. It also reduces the effort it takes to respond in early trials, helping the learner to gain momentum. This method also supports the development of independent responding through the systematic fading of prompts.

However, backward chaining is often inefficient for learners who can already perform earlier steps of the task independently. It can also be more time-intensive as the instructor must complete multiple steps early on in the trials. Learners also may become dependent on prompts if they are not faded in time.

== Prompting ==
The two types of prompting in a behavior chain are either most to least(MTL) or least to most (LTM).

MTL prompting is when the most intrusive prompt is introduced initially and then systematically faded out to least intrusive prompts. This prompting method is mainly used when the task analysis is being taught.

LTM prompting there is no prompt initially, and the intrusiveness of the prompt is increased as necessary for each step of the task analysis. This prompting method is mainly used when you are doing an error correction on a specific step in the task analysis the learner has experience with.

== Fading & Mastery ==
In order to fade prompts on the steps being targeted the learner must show increased independence. The fading technique used will be most to least because the skills being worked on are new. The prompts will be decreased to least intrusive when the learner shows increased ability to complete the task with less assistance.

To determine mastery, assessments are done prior to the chaining procedure being implemented to establish the learner's mastery level. There are two methods that can be used to assess mastery: single and multiple opportunity.

1. Single Opportunity: the learner is stopped if any step is skipped or they are unable to complete it.
2. Multiple Opportunity: allowing the learner to attempt each step in the chain

Once the mastery level has been established, a mastery criterion is also determined before the chain can be implemented. The mastery criterion is set for each of the steps and learner is said to have mastered the skill once they can perform all steps on the chain at the predetermined mastery criterion.

== See also ==
- Applied behavior analysis
- Task analysis
- Forward chaining
- Backward chaining
