= Ernest Hill =

Ernest Hill may refer to:

- Ernest Hill (musician) (1900–1964), American jazz double-bassist
- Ernest Hill (author) (1914–2003), English science fiction author

== See also ==
- Ernest Friedman-Hill, principal member of the technical staff at Sandia National Laboratories
- Ernestine Hill (1899–1972), Australian journalist, travel writer and novelist
- Hill (surname)
