= Angololo Multipurpose Dam =

Multipurpose dam in Kenya and Uganda

- Map of Uganda showing the location of Angololo Multipurpose Dam
- Country: Uganda
- Location: Kalait, Tororo District, Eastern Region
- Coordinates: 00°44′13″N 34°18′35″E
- Purpose: Drinking, irrigation & power
- Status: Proposed
- Construction began: April 2023 (expected)
- Opening date: H2: 2025 (estimate)
- Construction cost: US$1,830,000
- Owners: Government of Kenya & Government of Uganda
- Operator: UETCL

Dam and spillways
- Impounds: Malaba River
- Height: 30 metres (98 ft)
- Dam volume: 43,000,000 cubic meters (4.3×10^{10} L)

Reservoir
- Normal elevation: 1,400 m (4,600 ft)

Power Station
- Commission date: 2026 (expected)
- Installed capacity: 1.75 MW (2,350 hp)

The Angololo Multipurpose Dam is a planned dam across the Malaba River, at the border between Kenya and Uganda. The dam will create a reservoir capable of storing 43,000,000 cubic meters (4.3×10^{10} L) of water for drinking, irrigation and power generation. An estimated 3,300 hectares (8,200 acres) are expected to come under irrigation (1,180 hectares (2,900 acres) in Kenya and 2,120 hectares (5,200 acres) in Uganda), with water from this dam. The dam is expected to benefit at least 127,300 people in both countries. The dam is also expected to support a mini-hydroelectric power station with capacity of 1.75 megawatts.

== Location ==
Angololo Dam would be located in Bugesera Village, in Tororo District, in the Eastern Region of Uganda. The power station would be located across the Malaba River, which forms the international border between Kenya and Uganda. This is approximately 15 kilometres (9 mi) by road, northeast of the town of Tororo, where the headquarters of Tororo District are located. Kalait Village is approximately 52 kilometres (32 mi) southeast of Mbale, the largest city in Uganda's Eastern Region.

== Overview ==
The dam at this location has been in the plans as far back as 2010. That year, the Nile Equatorial Lakes Subsidiary Action Program (NELSAP) carried out prefeasibility studies with financing in form of grants from the Royal Government of Norway and the Royal Government of Sweden. Following these discoveries, the governments of the two East African countries requested NELSAP to integrate the dam into "its pipeline of projects for further appraisal and development". The project's catchment area measures 430 square kilometres (166 sq mi).

NELSAP undertook a full feasibility study, detailed project designs, conducted environmental and social impact assessment (ESIA), developed a resettlement and compensation action plan (RCAP), and prepared tender documents. This phase of development took 34 months and concluded in July 2022. It cost an estimated US$1.83 million.

== Cost and funding ==
As of July 2022, the cost of construction had not been made public. Funding is expected in form of a loan from New Partnership for Africa's Development (NEPAD). This project received financing support from the African Development Bank during the feasibility study stage.

== Other considerations ==
This water supply project is expected to increase the potable water supply to the towns of Tororo, Manafwa and Namisindwa in Uganda, and to Busia and Bungoma in Kenya.

== See also ==
- List of power stations in Uganda
