= Population-based incremental learning =

Optimization algorithm

In computer science and machine learning, population-based incremental learning (PBIL) is an optimization algorithm, and an estimation of distribution algorithm. This is a type of genetic algorithm where the genotype of an entire population (probability vector) is evolved rather than individual members. The algorithm is proposed by Shumeet Baluja in 1994. The algorithm is simpler than a standard genetic algorithm, and in many cases leads to better results than a standard genetic algorithm.

== Algorithm ==
In PBIL, genes are represented as real values in the range [0,1], indicating the probability that any particular allele appears in that gene.

The PBIL algorithm is as follows:

1. A population is generated from the probability vector.
2. The fitness of each member is evaluated and ranked.
3. Update population genotype (probability vector) based on fittest individual.
4. Mutate.
5. Repeat steps 1–4

== Source code ==
This is a part of source code implemented in Java. In the paper, learnRate = 0.1, negLearnRate = 0.075, mutProb = 0.02, and mutShift = 0.05 is used. N = 100 and ITER_COUNT = 1000 is enough for a small problem.

public void optimize() {
    final int totalBits = getTotalBits();
    final double[] probVec = new double[totalBits];
    Arrays.fill(probVec, 0.5);
    bestCost = POSITIVE_INFINITY;
 
    for (int i = 0; i < ITER_COUNT; i++) {
        // Creates N genes
        final boolean[][] genes = new [N][totalBits];
        for (boolean[] gene : genes) {
            for (int k = 0; k < gene.length; k++) {
                if (rand_nextDouble() < probVec[k])
                    gene[k] = true;
            }
        }

        // Calculate costs
        final double[] costs = new double[N];
        for (int j = 0; j < N; j++) {
            costs[j] = costFunc.cost(toRealVec(genes[j], domains));
        }

        // Find min and max cost genes
        boolean[] minGene = null, maxGene = null;
        double minCost = POSITIVE_INFINITY, maxCost = NEGATIVE_INFINITY;
        for (int j = 0; j < N; j++) {
            double cost = costs[j];
            if (minCost > cost) {
                minCost = cost;
                minGene = genes[j];
            }
            if (maxCost < cost) {
                maxCost = cost;
                maxGene = genes[j];
            }
        }

        // Compare with the best cost gene
        if (bestCost > minCost) {
            bestCost = minCost;
            bestGene = minGene;
        }

        // Update the probability vector with max and min cost genes
        for (int j = 0; j < totalBits; j++) {
            if (minGene[j] == maxGene[j]) {
                probVec[j] = probVec[j] * (1d - learnRate) +
                        (minGene[j] ? 1d : 0d) * learnRate;
            } else {
                final double learnRate2 = learnRate + negLearnRate;
                probVec[j] = probVec[j] * (1d - learnRate2) +
                        (minGene[j] ? 1d : 0d) * learnRate2;
            }
        }

        // Mutation
        for (int j = 0; j < totalBits; j++) {
            if (rand.nextDouble() < mutProb) {
                probVec[j] = probVec[j] * (1d - mutShift) +
                        (rand.nextBoolean() ? 1d : 0d) * mutShift;
            }
        }
    }
}

== See also ==
- Estimation of distribution algorithm (EDA)
- Learning Classifier System (LCS)
