= FuzzyCLIPS =

FuzzyCLIPS is a fuzzy logic extension of the CLIPS (C Language Integrated Production System) expert system shell from NASA. It was developed by the Integrated Reasoning Group of the Institute for Information Technology of the National Research Council of Canada and has been widely distributed for a number of years. It enhances CLIPS by providing a fuzzy reasoning capability that is fully integrated with CLIPS facts and inference engine allowing one to represent and manipulate fuzzy facts and rules. FuzzyCLIPS can deal with exact, fuzzy (or inexact), and combined reasoning, allowing fuzzy and normal terms to be freely mixed in the rules and facts of an expert system. The system uses two basic inexact concepts, fuzziness and uncertainty. It has provided a useful environment for developing fuzzy applications but it does require significant effort to update and maintain as new versions of CLIPS are released.

From a technical perspective, the software was developed for a PC and can be downloaded without costs for noncommercial applications. There is no GUI available but a command line is provided. The FuzzyCLIPS program allows to implement a fuzzy production system. That is an expert system which contains membership functions and rules.
