= Jess (programming language) =

Programming language

- Developer: Sandia National Laboratories
- Initial release: 1995; 31 years ago
- Stable release: 7.1p2 / November 5, 2008; 17 years ago
- Written in: Java
- Platform: Java
- License: Proprietary, public domain

Jess is a rule engine for the Java computing platform, written in the Java programming language. It was developed by Ernest Friedman-Hill of Sandia National Laboratories. It is a superset of the CLIPS language. It was first written in late 1995. The language provides rule-based programming for the automation of an expert system, and is often termed as an expert system shell. In recent years, intelligent agent systems have also developed, which depend on a similar ability.

Rather than a procedural paradigm, where one program has a loop that is activated only one time, the declarative paradigm used by Jess applies a set of rules to a set of facts continuously by a process named pattern matching. Rules can modify the set of facts, or can execute any Java code. It uses the Rete algorithm to execute rules.

== License ==
The licensing for Jess is freeware for education and government use, and is proprietary software, needing a license, for commercial use. In contrast, CLIPS, which is the basis and starting code for Jess, is free and open-source software.

== Code examples ==
Code examples:

; is a comment

(bind ?x 100)

; x = 100

(deffunction max (?a ?b)
             (if (> ?a ?b) then ?a else ?b))

(deffacts myroom
          (furniture chair)
          (furniture table)
          (furniture bed)
          )

(deftemplate car
             (slot color)
             (slot mileage)
             (slot value)
             )

(assert (car (color red) (mileage 10000) (value 400)))

Sample code:

(clear)
(deftemplate blood-donor (slot name) (slot type))
(deffacts blood-bank ; put names & their types into [[working memory]]
          (blood-donor (name "Alice")(type "A"))
          (blood-donor (name "Agatha")(type "A"))
          (blood-donor (name "Bob")(type "B"))
          (blood-donor (name "Barbara")(type "B"))
          (blood-donor (name "Jess")(type "AB"))
          (blood-donor (name "Karen")(type "AB"))
          (blood-donor (name "Onan")(type "O"))
          (blood-donor (name "Osbert")(type "O"))
          )
(defrule can-give-to-same-type-but-not-self ; handles A > A, B > B, O > O, AB > AB, but not N1 > N1
         (blood-donor (name ?name)(type ?type))
         (blood-donor (name ?name2)(type ?type2 &:(eq ?type ?type2) &: (neq ?name ?name2) ))
         =>
         (printout t ?name " can give blood to " ?name2 crlf)
         )
(defrule O-gives-to-others-but-not-itself ; O to O cover in above rule
         (blood-donor (name ?name)(type ?type &:(eq ?type "O")))
         (blood-donor (name ?name2)(type ?type2 &: (neq ?type ?type2) &: (neq ?name ?name2) ))
         =>
         (printout t ?name " can give blood to " ?name2 crlf)
         )
(defrule A-or-B-gives-to-AB ; case O gives to AB and AB gives to AB already dealt with
         (blood-donor (name ?name)(type ?type &:(or (eq ?type "A") (eq ?type "B" ))))
         (blood-donor (name ?name2)(type ?type2 &: (eq ?type2 "AB") &: (neq ?name ?name2) ))
         =>
         (printout t ?name " can give blood to " ?name2 crlf)
         )
;(watch all)
(reset)
(run)

== See also ==
- Semantic reasoner
- Decision Model and Notation

=== Related systems ===
- CLIPS: public-domain software tool to build expert systems
- ILOG rules: business rule management system
- JBoss Drools: business rule management system (BRMS)
- Prolog: general purpose logic programming language
- OpenL Tablets: business centric rules and BRMS
- DTRules: decision table based, open-source rule engine for Java
