= Institute of Accounting and Commerce =

South African professional association

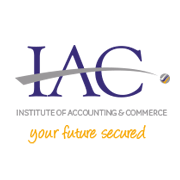
- Abbreviation: IAC
- Formation: 1927
- Legal status: Nonprofit organization
- Headquarters: Cape Town, South Africa
- Region served: South Africa
- President: Mr A.W Bezuidenhout
- Vice President: Mr S.T Cupido
- Chief Executive Officer: Mr E Nagia
- Website: www.iacsa.co.za
- Formerly called: The Institute of Administration and Commerce

The Institute of Accounting and Commerce (IAC) is a Recognised Controlling Body for Accounting Professionals, Tax and Business Rescue Practitioners based in South Africa and is a registered professional body under the National Qualifications Framework Act, 2008. The Institute regularly publishes articles in various publications and distributes a journal to members

== History ==
The Institute of Accounting and Commerce (IAC) was established in 1927 as a provider of distance learning education and a professional management institute. In 2009 the Institute changed to become a professional accounting membership body only and is registered in South Africa as a non-profit company (NPC) (Reg. No. 1981/011981/08).

In terms of section 60 of the close corporations act 69 of 1984, the IAC registers Accounting Officers , and since 2013 is also a Recognised Controlling Body with the South African Revenue Service (SARS) for Tax Practitioners (in terms of section 240 of the tax administration act 28 of 2011). On 21 October 2016 the IAC became a Registered Controlling Body for Business Rescue Practitioners (in terms of Section 138 of the Companies Act 71 of 2008).

== Associated organizations ==
The IAC is a member of the Pan African Federation of Accountants (PAFA)
