= Ernest Friedman-Hill =

American computer programmer

Dr. Ernest Friedman-Hill is a principal member of the technical staff at Sandia National Laboratories. They are located in Livermore, California.

Friedman-Hill is the author of Jess, the rule engine for the Java platform, which was first written in 1995. He is also a teacher of Java programming at two campuses in California.
