= Charles Forgy =

American computer scientist

Charles L. Forgy (born December 12, 1949, in Texas) is an American computer scientist, known for developing the Rete algorithm used in his OPS5 and other production system languages used to build expert systems.

== Early life and education ==
Forgy attended Woodrow Wilson High School in Dallas, Texas, and then advanced to Arlington State College (now University of Texas at Arlington, or UTA) graduating with a degree in mathematics in 1972. From there he went to Carnegie Institute of Technology (later Carnegie Mellon University) in Pittsburgh, a renowned center for study of artificial intelligence. While studying at Carnegie he met his future wife, Diana, whom he married in 1977.

== Career ==
=== Rete ===
As a student of Allen Newell, he received his Ph.D. in 1979 based on the Rete algorithm. Even though Forgy did not work directly on the DEC XCON AI problem of configuring computers for DEC in the late 1970s and early 1980s, the Rete algorithm was later incorporated into the system for more speed. The XCON used the early versions of OPS (Official Production System) that migrated to OPS2 and later OPS5.

DEC reported that XCON saved at least $1M USD per year. XCON, a project headed up by John McDermott and later transferred to DEC programmers, was eventually composed of over 10K rules. The Rete (Latin for "network") algorithm allowed systems to run as much as 3,000 times faster in those days. The original Rete algorithm was developed under a Department of Defence grant and, as such, is public domain.

=== Rete II and III ===
Forgy remained at Carnegie Mellon post-graduation and worked on further improvements to OPS5; in 1983 he formed a company called Production Systems Technologies to develop and sell rule-based software, where he developed "Rete II", a more efficient successor to Rete. Rete II enabled rule-based programs to run between 50 and 100 times faster than the original Rete algorithm, depending on the complexity of the rules and objects. (The more complex, the faster the comparative results.) Rete II is incorporated in CLIPS/R2, OPSJ and FICO's Blaze Advisor.

Forgy was a founder and chief scientist for Rules Power, a Work Flow Management company founded in 2002 and based in Boston. During that time, Forgy incorporated Rete II with Relational Logic Technology, which became named "Rete III". The performance of Rete II and Rete III are virtually the same but Rete III has some extensions that allow it to work more efficiently with Relational Logic Technology but slows it down on benchmarks.

=== Rete-NT ===
Forgy developed a next-generation algorithm, called Rete-NT, that has improved the execution speed by another order of magnitude. To this date Sparkling Logic SMARTS is the only BRMS product that uses this algorithm.

=== Present times ===
In 2005, RulesPower was acquired by Fair Isaac Corporation, who obtained a license to integrate Rete III into Blaze Advisor, their own business rules product.

Forgy retained the intellectual property rights to Rete II and his personal company, Production Systems Technology, still sells OPSJ and other systems that incorporate the Rete II algorithm. KnowledgeBased Systems Corporation, an independent consulting company in Texas, maintains an extensive set of benchmarks for most BRMS and rule-based systems that demonstrate the effectiveness of the Rete and Rete II algorithms. Forgy has often described PST as a research-oriented company rather than a vendor of BRMS tools, but he does sell various rule-based tools via PST.

Forgy terminated his relationship with FICO in 2010 and joined Sparkling Logic as investor and strategic advisor. He has contributed his latest algorithm, Rete-NT, to the Sparkling Logic SMARTS product.

== Selected works ==
- Charles Forgy, "A network match routine for production systems." Working Paper, 1974.
- Charles Forgy, ""On the efficient implementation of production systems." Ph.D. Thesis, Carnegie-Mellon University, 1979.
- Charles, Forgy (1982). "Rete: A Fast Algorithm for the Many Pattern/Many Object Pattern Match Problem". Artificial Intelligence. 19: 17–37. doi:10.1016/0004-3702(82)90020-0.
