= Manafwa District =

- District
- District location in Uganda
- Coordinates: 01°01′N 34°21′E
- Country: Uganda
- Region: Eastern Region
- Sub-region: Bugisu sub-region
- Established: 1 July 1999
- Capital: Manafwa

Area
  - Land: 602.1 km^{2} (232.5 sq mi)

Population (2012 Estimate)
  - Total: 367,500
  - Density: 610.4/km^{2} (1,581/sq mi)
- Time zone: UTC+3 (EAT)
- Website: www.manafwa.go.ug

Manafwa District is a district in the Eastern Region of Uganda. Manafwa is the district headquarters.

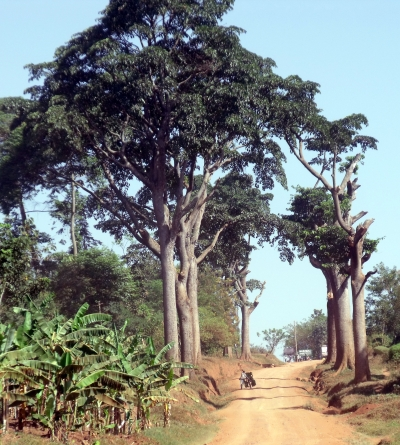
Mvule (Milicia excelsa) trees growing by the side of a road in Manafwa District, Uganda

== Location ==
Manafwa District is bordered by Bududa District to the north, Kenya to the east and south, Tororo District to the south-west, and Mbale District to the west. The district headquarters at Manafwa are located approximately 27 kilometres (17 mi), by road, south-east of Mbale, the largest city of in the sub-region. County and sub county of Manafwa District.

=== Bubulo west county ===
This county has the biggest number of sub county in Manafwa District and they include:

- Bugobero
- Bugobero town council
- Bukewa
- Bunabutsale
- Busukuya
- Butooto
- Butta
- Buwagogo
- Buwangani town council
- Kaato
- Khabutoola
- Kimaluli
- Lwanjusi
- Manafwa town council
- Masaka town council
- Nalondo
- Nangalwe
- Sibanga
- Weswa

=== Butiru county ===
The sub county for butiru county include:

- Bukhadala
- Bukhofa
- Bukoma
- Bukusu
- Bunabwana
- Butiru
- Butiru town council
- Buwaya town council
- Buyinza town council
- Maefe
- Makenya
- Mayanza
- Sisuni

== Overview ==
Manafwa District was created in 2005. Previously, it was part of Mbale District, together with Sironko District. The total surface area of the district is estimated at 602.1 square kilometres (232.5 mi^{2}). In 2006, the northern part of Manafwa District was carved off to form Bududa District. It is made up of 1 county and 18 rural sub-counties, 4 town councils, 3 traditional divisions (Buwagogo, Bugobero and Butiru), 81 parishes and 862 villages.

== Population ==
In 1991, the national population census estimated the district population at 178,500. The 2002 census estimated the population at 262,600 inhabitants. In 2012, the population was estimated at 367,500. In 2014, the population was 149,544, and In 2024, the population was 186,917.

== Economic activity ==
- Irish potatoes
- Rice
- Maize
- Cotton
- Matooke
- Beans

== Livestock ==
- Cattle
- Goats
- Chicken
- Sheep

== See also ==
- Bamasaba
- Bugisu sub-region
- Parliament of Uganda
- Eastern Region, Uganda
- Districts of Uganda
