= Manafwa =

- Map of Uganda showing the location of Manafwa.
- Coordinates: 00°55′11″N 34°17′28″E
- Country: Uganda
- District: Manafwa District
- Elevation: 1,196 m (3,924 ft)

Population (2020 Estimate)
  - Total: 16,000
- Time zone: UTC+3 (EAT)

Manafwa is a town in the Eastern Region of Uganda. It is the largest town in Manafwa District and the site of the district headquarters.

== Location ==
Manafwa is located approximately 32 kilometres (20 mi), by road, southeast of the city of Mbale, the largest metropolitan area in the sub-region. This is approximately 247 kilometres (153 mi), northeast of Kampala, Uganda's capital and largest city. The coordinates of Manafwa Town are 0°55'11.0"N, 34°17'28.0"E (Latitude:0.919723; Longitude:34.291099). Manafwa Town Council sits at an average elevation of 1,196 metres (3,924 ft), above mean sea level. The town is located within Mount Elgon National Park and is surrounded by tropical mountainous terrain.

== Population ==
The national population census in 2002 put the town population at about 11,740. In 2010, the Uganda Bureau of Statistics (UBOS) estimated the population at 15,400. In 2011, UBOS estimated the mid-year population at 15,800.

In 2015, UBOS estimated the population of the town at 14,200. In 2020, the population agency estimate the mid-year population of Manafwa Town Council at 16,000. Of these, 8,200 (51.2 percent were female) and 7.800 (48.8 percent) were male. UBOS calculated that the town's population grew at an average rate of 2.4 percent annually, between 2015 and 2020.

Historical population
Year	Pop.	±%
2002	11,740	—
2010	15,400	+31.2%
2011	15,800	+2.6%
2014	13,645	−13.6%
2015	14,200	+4.1%
2020	16,000	+12.7%

== Points of interest ==
The following additional points of interest lie within the town limits or near the edges of town:

1. The offices of Manafwa Town Council

2. Manafwa Central Market

3. A mobile branch of PostBank Uganda

4. Manafwa River, immediately south of town

5. Stanbic Bank Uganda Limited maintains a branch in Manafwa town.

== See also ==
- Manafwa District
- List of cities and towns in Uganda
