= Ontology engineering =

Field that studies the methods and methodologies for building ontologies

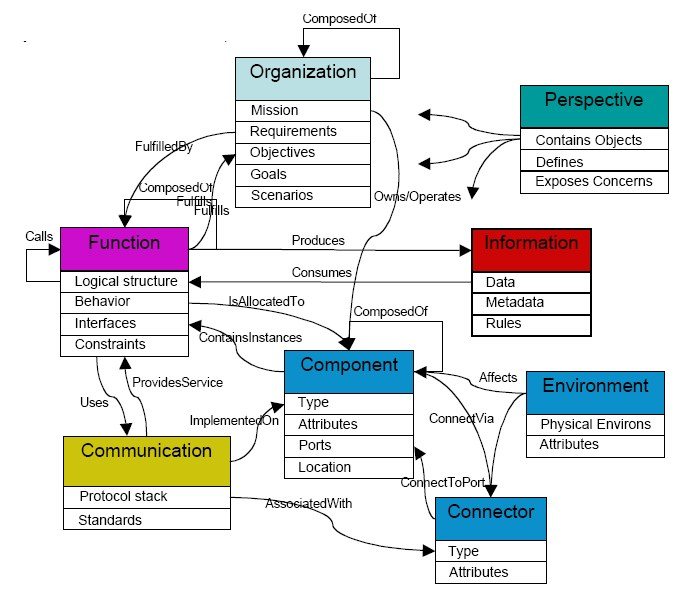
Example of a constructed MBED Top Level Ontology based on the nominal set of views

In computer science, information science and systems engineering, ontology engineering is a field which studies the methods and methodologies for building ontologies, which encompasses a representation, formal naming and definition of the categories, properties and relations between the concepts, data and entities of a given domain of interest. In a broader sense, this field also includes a knowledge construction of the domain using formal ontology representations such as OWL/RDF. A large-scale representation of abstract concepts such as actions, time, physical objects and beliefs would be an example of ontological engineering. Ontology engineering is one of the areas of applied ontology, and can be seen as an application of philosophical ontology. Core ideas and objectives of ontology engineering are also central in conceptual modeling.

Ontology engineering aims at making explicit the knowledge contained within software applications, and within enterprises and business procedures for a particular domain. Ontology engineering offers a direction towards solving the inter-operability problems brought about by semantic obstacles, i.e. the obstacles related to the definitions of business terms and software classes. Ontology engineering is a set of tasks related to the development of ontologies for a particular domain.

— Line Pouchard, Nenad Ivezic and Craig Schlenoff,

Automated processing of information not interpretable by software agents can be improved by adding rich semantics to the corresponding resources, such as video files. One of the approaches for the formal conceptualization of represented knowledge domains is the use of machine-interpretable ontologies, which provide structured data in, or based on, RDF, RDFS, and OWL. Ontology engineering is the design and creation of such ontologies, which can contain more than just the list of terms (controlled vocabulary); they contain terminological, assertional, and relational axioms to define concepts (classes), individuals, and roles (properties) (TBox, ABox, and RBox, respectively). Ontology engineering is a relatively new field of study concerning the ontology development process, the ontology life cycle, the methods and methodologies for building ontologies, and the tool suites and languages that support them. A common way to provide the logical underpinning of ontologies is to formalize the axioms with description logics, which can then be translated to any serialization of RDF, such as RDF/XML or Turtle. Beyond the description logic axioms, ontologies might also contain SWRL rules. The concept definitions can be mapped to any kind of resource or resource segment in RDF, such as images, videos, and regions of interest, to annotate objects, persons, etc., and interlink them with related resources across knowledge bases, ontologies, and LOD datasets. This information, based on human experience and knowledge, is valuable for reasoners for the automated interpretation of sophisticated and ambiguous contents, such as the visual content of multimedia resources. Application areas of ontology-based reasoning include, but are not limited to, information retrieval, automated scene interpretation, and knowledge discovery.

== Languages ==
An ontology language is a formal language used to encode the ontology. There are a number of such languages for ontologies, both proprietary and standards-based:

- Common logic is ISO standard 24707, a specification for a family of ontology languages that can be accurately translated into each other.
- The Cyc project has its own ontology language called CycL, based on first-order predicate calculus with some higher-order extensions.
- The Gellish language includes rules for its own extension and thus integrates an ontology with an ontology language.
- IDEF5 is a software engineering method to develop and maintain usable, accurate, domain ontologies.
- KIF is a syntax for first-order logic that is based on S-expressions.
- Rule Interchange Format (RIF), F-Logic and its successor ObjectLogic combine ontologies and rules.
- OWL is a language for making ontological statements, developed as a follow-on from RDF and RDFS, as well as earlier ontology language projects including OIL, DAML and DAML+OIL. OWL is intended to be used over the World Wide Web, and all its elements (classes, properties and individuals) are defined as RDF resources, and identified by URIs.
- OntoUML is a well-founded language for specifying reference ontologies.
- SHACL (RDF SHapes Constraints Language) is a language for describing structure of RDF data. It can be used together with RDFS and OWL or it can be used independently from them.
- XBRL (Extensible Business Reporting Language) is a syntax for expressing business semantics.

== Methodologies and tools ==
- DOGMA
- KAON
- OntoClean
- HOZO
- Protégé (software)
- Large language models

== In life sciences ==
Life sciences is flourishing with ontologies that biologists use to make sense of their experiments. For inferring correct conclusions from experiments, ontologies have to be structured optimally against the knowledge base they represent. The structure of an ontology needs to be changed continuously so that it is an accurate representation of the underlying domain.

Recently, an automated method was introduced for engineering ontologies in life sciences such as Gene Ontology (GO), one of the most successful and widely used biomedical ontology. Based on information theory, it restructures ontologies so that the levels represent the desired specificity of the concepts. Similar information theoretic approaches have also been used for optimal partition of Gene Ontology. Given the mathematical nature of such engineering algorithms, these optimizations can be automated to produce a principled and scalable architecture to restructure ontologies such as GO.

Open Biomedical Ontologies (OBO), a 2006 initiative of the U.S. National Center for Biomedical Ontology, provides a common 'foundry' for various ontology initiatives, amongst which are:

- The Generic Model Organism Project (GMOD)
- Gene Ontology Consortium
- Sequence Ontology
- Ontology Lookup Service
- The Plant Ontology Consortium
- Standards and Ontologies for Functional Genomics

and more

== See also ==
- ISO/IEC 21838 – ISO standard for top-level ontologies
- Ontology (information science) – Specification of a conceptualization
- Ontology components – Description of aspects of ontology
- Ontology double articulation
- Ontology learning – Automatic creation of ontologies
- Ontology modularization
- Semantic decision table
- Semantic integration – Interrelating info from diverse sources
- Semantic technology – Technology to help machines understand data
- Semantic Web – Extension of the Web to facilitate data exchange
- Linked data – Structured data and method for its publication
