= Redland RDF Application Framework =

Redland is a set of free software libraries written in C that provide support for the Resource Description Framework (RDF), created by Dave Beckett (a former resident of Redland, Bristol).

The packages that form Redland are:

- Redland RDF Application Framework providing the C RDF API
- Raptor RDF Parser Toolkit for parsing and serializing RDF syntaxes (RDF/XML, N-Triples, Turtle, RSS tag soup, Atom)
- Rasqal RDF Query Library for executing RDF queries with RDQL and SPARQL
- Redland Language Bindings for APIs to Redland in C#, Java, Objective-C, Perl, PHP, Python, Ruby and Tcl

Redland is a mature set of libraries, in development since 2000 and closely conformant to the relevant W3C specifications.

== See also ==
- Semantic Web
