= Natasha Noy =

Russian-born American computer scientist

- Born: Natalya Fridman Noy; Russia
- Education: Moscow State University (BS); Boston University (MS); Northeastern University (PhD)
- Known for: Protégé ontology editor Google Dataset Search
- Awards: AAAI Fellow (2020); ACM Fellow (2023)
- Scientific career
- Fields: Semantic Web; Ontologies; Structured data Data integration
- Workplaces: Google; Stanford University
- Thesis: Knowledge representation for intelligent information retrieval in experimental sciences (1997)
- Website: research.google.com/pubs/NatalyaNoy.html

Natasha Fridman Noy is a Russian-born American Research scientist who works at Google Research in Mountain View, CA, who focuses on making structured data more accessible and usable. She is the team leader for Dataset Search, a web-based search engine for all datasets. Natasha worked at Stanford Center for Biomedical Informatics Research before joining Google, where she made significant contributions to ontology building and alignment, as well as collaborative ontology engineering. Natasha is on the Editorial Boards of many Semantic Web and Information Systems publications and is the Immediate Past President of the Semantic Web Science Association. From 2011 to 2017, she was the president of the Semantic Web Science Association.

== Education ==
Natasha Noy earned a bachelor's degree in applied mathematics from Moscow State University, a master's degree in computer science from Boston University and a doctorate from Northeastern University. Her thesis focused on knowledge-rich documents, in particular information retrieval for scientific articles.

== Career and research ==
Noy moved from Northeastern to Stanford University, to work with Mark Musen on the Protégé ontology editor as a postdoctoral researcher, and later as a research scientist. It was here that she completed her important work on Prompt, an environment for automated ontology alignment, which was published in 2002. For recognizing the specifics of the problem and providing an inventive solution, this study received the AAAI classic paper award in 2018. By far her most widely distributed work, however, was the Ontology 101 tutorial, which Noy developed as part of the education program for Protégé customers, the tutorial became a standard introductory document for the semantic web and ontologies, It has been cited nearly 6800 times as of 2018, and downloaded often.

=== Google Dataset Search ===
In April 2014, Noy went to Google Research; Google has released a search engine to help researchers find publicly available online data. On September 5, the program was launched, and it is aimed towards "scientists, data journalists, data geeks, or anybody else." Dataset Search, which is now following Google's other specialized search engines including news and picture search, as well as Google Scholar and Google Books, locates files and databases based on how their owners have categorised them. It does not read the content of the files in the same manner that search engines read web pages. Researchers who want to know what kinds of data are accessible or who want to find data that they already know exists, according to Natasha Noy, must often rely on word of mouth, this problem is particularly acute, according to Noy, for early-career academics who have yet to "connect" into a network of professional ties. Noy and her Google colleague Dan Brickley wrote a blog post in January 2017 proposing a solution to the problem. Typical search engines operate in two stages: The first stage is to search the Internet for sites to index on a regular basis, the second stage is to rank those indexed sites so that the engine can return relevant results in order when a user puts in a search word. Owners of datasets should 'tag' them using a standardized vocabulary called Schema.org. According to Noy and Brickley, Google and three other search engine behemoths (Microsoft, Yahoo, and Yandex) created Schema.org to help search engines in scanning existing data sets.

=== Awards and honors ===
Noy is best known for her work on the Protégé ontology editor and the Prompt alignment tool, for which she and co-author Mark Musen received the AAAI Classic Paper award in 2018, the AAAI Classic Paper award honors the author(s) of the most influential paper(s) from a specific conference year, with the time period examined advancing by one year per year. She was elected an AAAI Fellow in 2020 and an ACM Fellow in 2023.
