= DQL =

DQL may refer to:

- DAML+OIL Query Language, an RDF query language.
- Data query language, particularly for SQL.
- Doctrine Query Language, for Doctrine (PHP).
