= Protocol for Web Description Resources =

The Protocol for Web Description Resources (POWDER) is the W3C recommended method for describing Web resources. It specifies a protocol for publishing metadata about Web resources using RDF, OWL, and HTTP.

The initial working party was formed in February 2007 with the W3C Content Label Incubator Group's 2006 work as an input. On 1 September 2009 POWDER became a W3C recommendation and the Working Group is now closed.

POWDER supersedes the previous W3C specification PICS.
