= Bnode =

Bnode may refer to:

- Blank node, a type of representation in information science
- Bnode group, a holding company of the Belgian postal company bpost
