= KAON =

Ontology infrastructure

KAON (Karlsruhe ontology) is an ontology infrastructure developed by the University of Karlsruhe and the Research Center for Information Technologies in Karlsruhe. Its first incarnation was developed in 2002 and supported an enhanced version of RDF ontologies. Several tools like the graphical ontology editor OIModeler or the KAON Server were based on KAON.

There are ontology learning companion tools which take non-annotated natural language text as input: TextToOnto (KAON-based) and Text2Onto (KAON2-based). Text2Onto is based on the Probabilistic Ontology Model (POM).

In 2005, the first version of KAON2 was released, offering fast reasoning support for OWL ontologies. KAON2 is not backward-compatible with KAON. KAON2 is developed as a joint effort of the Information Process Engineering (IPE) at the Research Center for Information Technologies (FZI), the Institute of Applied Informatics and Formal Description Methods (AIFB) at the University of Karlsruhe, and the Information Management Group (IMG) at the University of Manchester.

KAON, TextToOnto, and Text2Onto are open source, based on Java. KAON2 is not open source, but the executable can be downloaded from the KAON2 site.
