= Trig (disambiguation) =

Trigonometry is a branch of mathematics that studies relationships between side lengths and angles of triangles.

Trig also may refer to:

- Trig functions
- TriG (syntax), a format for storing and transmitting Resource Description Framework (RDF) data
- Trig points, also known as triangulation stations
- Trig Paxson Van Palin, son of former Alaska Governor Sarah Palin
- Trigedasleng, or Trig, a language used on the TV series The 100
- Crickets of the subfamily Trigonidiinae

== See also ==
- Spherical trigonometry
- Non-euclidean geometry
- Celestial navigation
