= SHACL =

World Wide Web Consortium standard

- Shapes Constraint Language
- Abbreviation: SHACL
- Status: Published, W3C Recommendation
- Year started: 2015
- First published: October 8, 2015; 10 years ago
- Organization: W3C
- Committee: RDF Data Shapes Working Group
- Editors: Holger Knublauch; Dimitris Kontokostas
- Base standards: RDF; SPARQL
- Related standards: RDF Schema; OWL
- Domain: Semantic Web
- Website: www.w3.org/TR/shacl/

Shapes Constraint Language (SHACL) is a World Wide Web Consortium (W3C) standard language for describing Resource Description Framework (RDF) graphs. SHACL has been designed to enhance the semantic and technical interoperability layers of ontologies expressed as RDF graphs.

SHACL models are defined in terms of constraints on the content, structure and meaning of a graph. SHACL is a highly expressive language. Among others, it includes features to express conditions that constrain the number of values that a property may have, the type of such values, numeric ranges, string matching patterns, and logical combinations of such constraints. SHACL also includes an extension mechanism to express more complex conditions in languages such as SPARQL and JavaScript. SHACL Rules add inferencing capabilities to SHACL, allowing users to define what new statements can be inferred from existing (asserted) statements.

== Terminology ==
SHACL lets its users describe shapes of data, targeting where a specific shape applies.

=== Property shapes ===
A property shape describes characteristics of graph nodes that can be reached via a specific path. A path can be a single predicate (property) or a chain of predicates. A property shape must always specify a path. This is done by using sh:path predicate. One can think of property shapes that use simple paths as describing values of certain properties e.g., values of an age property or values of a works for property. Complex paths can specify a combination of different predicates in a chain, including the inverse direction, alternative predicates and transitive chains.

Property shapes can be defined as part of a node shape. In this case, a node shape points to property shapes using sh:property predicate. Property shapes can also be "stand-alone" i.e., completely independent from any node shapes.

=== Node shapes ===
A node shape describes characteristics of specific graph nodes irrespective of how you get to them. It can, for example, be said that certain graph nodes must be literals or a URIs, etc. It is common to include property shapes into a node shape, effectively defining values of many different properties of a node.

For example, a node shape for an employee may incorporate property shapes for age and works for properties.

=== Constraints ===
A constraint is a way to describe characteristics of values. A shape contains one or more constraint declarations. SHACL provides many pre-built constraint types. For example, sh:datatype is used to describe the type of literal values e.g., if they are strings or integers or dates. sh:minCount is used to describe the minimum required number of values. sh:length is used to describe the number of characters for a value.

=== Targets ===
A target connects a shape with data it describes. The ways to define a shape target are:

1. State that a node shape is a class; the constraint applies to all instances of the class
2. State that a shape targets members of a certain class.
3. State that a shape targets a specific resource by giving its URI.
4. State that a shape targets all subjects or all objects of triples with a certain predicate.
5. Use a SPARQL query to select the targeted resources.

Target declarations can be included in a node shape or in a property shape. However, when a property shape is a part of a node shape, its own targets are ignored.

SHACL uses rdfs:subClassOf statements to identify targets. A shape targeting members of a class, also targets members of all its subclasses. In other words, all SHACL definitions for a class are inherited by subclasses.

== Validation ==
SHACL enables validation of graphs. A SHACL validation engine takes as input a graph to be validated (called data graph) and a graph containing SHACL shapes declarations (called shapes graph) and produces a validation report, also expressed as a graph. All these graphs can be represented in any Resource Description Framework (RDF) serialization formats including JSON-LD or Turtle.

SHACL is fairly unique in its approach in that it builds-in not only the ability to specify a severity level of validation results, but also the ability to return suggestions on how data may be fixed if the validation result is raised. Built-in levels are Violation, Warning and Info, defaulting to Violation if no sh:severity has been specified for a shape. Users of SHACL can add other, custom levels of severity. Validation results may also have values for other properties, as described in the specification. For example, the property sh:resultMessage is designed to communicate additional textual details to users, including recommendations on how data may be fixed to address to validation result. In cases where a constraint does not have any values for sh:message in the shapes graph the SHACL processor may automatically generate other values for sh:resultMessage. Some SHACL processors (e.g., the one implemented by TopQuadrant) made these suggestions actionable in software, automating their application on user's request.

== Specifications ==
World Wide Web Consortium published the following SHACL Specifications:

- SHACL (W3C Technical Recommendation) is the main document, defining the features of SHACL Core and its extension mechanism called SHACL-SPARQL. SHACL Core defines the basic syntax and structure of shapes, constraints, the built-in kinds of constraints, and how to link shapes to data nodes. SHACL-SPARQL defines how to express constraints that are not covered by the built-in constraint kinds.
- SHACL Advanced Features (W3C Working Group Note), the most recent version of which is maintained by the SHACL Community Group defines support for SHACL Rules, a powerful feature (inspired by SPIN rules) for data transformations, inferences and mappings based on data shapes. Also includes extensions of SHACL-SPARQL such as user-defined functions.
- SHACL JavaScript Extensions (W3C Working Group Note) defines how JavaScript can be used to express constraints, rules, functions and other features. This covers similar ground as SHACL-SPARQL, but using JavaScript as its execution language.
- SHACL Compact Syntax (SHACL Community Group Report).

== Open-source tools ==
The SHACL Test Suite and Implementation Report linked to from the SHACL W3C specification lists some open source tools that could be used for SHACL validation as of June 2019. By the end of 2019 many commercial RDF database and framework vendors announced support for at least SHACL Core.

Some of the open source tools listed in the report are:

- dotNetRDF SHACL - an online SHACL validator service written in the .NET Framework
- pySHACL - an open source SHACL validator library for command line use written in Python
- SHaclEX - a Scala implementation of both SHACL and ShEx
- TopBraid SHACL API - an open source implementation of SHACL by TopQuadrant, based on Apache Jena. It covers SHACL Core and SHACL-SPARQL validation as well as SHACL Advanced Features, SHACL Javascript Extension and SHACL Compact Syntax. The same code is used in the TopBraid commercial products.

SHACL Playground is a free SHACL validation service implemented in JavaScript.

Eclipse RDF4J is an open source Java framework by the Eclipse Foundation for processing RDF data, which supports SHACL validation.

== Commercial tools ==
SHACL is supported by most RDF Graph technology vendors including Cambridge Semantics (Anzo), eccenca Corporate Memory, Franz (AllegroGraph), Data Treehouse (maplib), Metaphacts, Ontotext (GraphDB), Stardog and TopQuadrant. There is even support in the commercial products that use property graph data model, such as Neo4J.

Levels of implementation may vary. At minimum, vendors support SHACL Core. Some also support SHACL SPARQL for higher expressivity, while others may support SHACL Advanced Features which include rules and functions.

== See also ==
- Shape Expressions (ShEx)
