= Metaclass (disambiguation) =

In programming languages, a metaclass is a class whose instances are classes.

Metaclass may also refer to:

- Metaclass (Semantic Web), a class whose instances are other classes instead of individuals

== See also ==
- Class (disambiguation)
- Meta (disambiguation)
