= Swoogle =

Search engine

- Original authors: Li Ding; Tim Finin; Anupam Joshi; Rong Pan; R. Scott Cost; Yun Peng; Pavan Reddivari; Vishal Doshi; Joel Sachs
- Website: swoogle.umbc.edu

Swoogle was a search engine for Semantic Web ontologies, documents, terms and data published on the Web. Swoogle employed a system of crawlers to discover RDF documents and HTML documents with embedded RDF content. Swoogle reasoned about these documents and their constituent parts (e.g., terms and triples) and recorded and indexed meaningful metadata about them in its database.

Swoogle provided services to human users through a browser interface and to software agents via RESTful web services. Several techniques were used to rank query results inspired by the PageRank algorithm developed at Google but adapted to the semantics and use patterns found in semantic web documents.

Swoogle was developed and hosted by the University of Maryland, Baltimore County (UMBC) with funding from the US DARPA and National Science Foundation agencies. It was PhD thesis work of Li Ding advised by Professor Tim Finin.

== See also ==
- Ontology (computer science)
- DAML and DAML+OIL
- OWL
- Semantic Web
