= Semantic decision table =

A semantic decision table uses modern ontology engineering technologies to enhance traditional a decision table. The term "semantic decision table" was coined by Yan Tang and Prof. Robert Meersman from VUB STARLab (Free University of Brussels) in 2006. A semantic decision table is a set of decision tables properly annotated with an ontology. It provides a means to capture and examine decision makers’ concepts, as well as a tool for refining their decision knowledge and facilitating knowledge sharing in a scalable manner.

== Background ==
A decision table is defined as a "tabular method of showing the relationship between a series of conditions and the resultant actions to be executed". Following the de facto international standard (CSA, 1970), a decision table contains three building blocks: the conditions, the actions (or decisions), and the rules.

A decision condition is constructed with a condition stub and a condition entry. A condition stub is declared as a statement of a condition. A condition entry provides a value assigned to the condition stub. Similarly, an action (or decision) composes two elements: an action stub and an action entry. One states an action with an action stub. An action entry specifies whether (or in what order) the action is to be performed.

A decision table separates the data (that is the condition entries and decision/action entries) from the decision templates (that are the condition stubs, decision/action stubs, and the relations between them). Or rather, a decision table can be a tabular result of its meta-rules.

Traditional decision tables have many advantages compared to other decision support manners, such as if-then-else programming statements, decision trees and Bayesian networks. A traditional decision table is compact and easily understandable. However, it still has several limitations. For instance, a decision table often faces the problems of conceptual ambiguity and conceptual duplication; and it is time consuming to create and maintain large decision tables. Semantic decision tables are an attempt to solve these problems.

== Definition ==
A semantic decision table is modeled based on the framework of Developing Ontology-Grounded Methods and Applications (DOGMA). The separation of an ontology into extremely simple linguistic structures (also known as lexons) and a layer of lexon constraints used by applications (also known as ontological commitments), aiming to achieve a degree of scalability.

According to the DOGMA framework, a semantic decision table consists of a layer of the decision binary fact types called semantic decision tables lexons and a semantic decision table commitment layer that consists of the constraints and axioms of these fact types.

A lexon l is a quintuple $<y,t_1,r_1,r_2,t_1>$ where $t_1$ and $t_2$ represent two concepts in a natural language (e.g., English); $r_1$ and $r_2$ (in, $r_1$ corresponds to "role and $r_2$ – refer to the relationships that the concepts share with respect to one another; $\gamma$ is a context identifier refers to a context, which serves to disambiguate the terms $t_1,t_2$ into the intended concepts, and in which they become meaningful.

For example, a lexon <γ, driver's license, is issued to, has, driver> explains a fact that “a driver’s license is issued to a driver”, and “a driver has a driver’s license”.

The ontological commitment layer formally defines selected rules and constraints by which an application (or "agent") may make use of lexons. A commitment can contain various constraints, rules and axiomatized binary facts based on needs. It can be modeled in different modeling tools, such as object-role modeling, conceptual graph, and Unified Modeling Language.

== Semantic decision table model ==
A semantic decision table contains richer decision rules than a decision table. During the annotation process, the decision makers need to specify all the implicit rules, including the hidden decision rules and the meta-rules of a set of decision tables. The semantics of these rules is derived from an agreement between the decision makers observing the real-world decision problems. The process of capturing semantics within a community is a process of knowledge acquisition.
