= Topincs =

Topincs is a software for rapid development of web databases and web applications. It is based on LAMP and the semantic technology Topic Maps. A Topincs web database makes information accessible through browsing very much like a Wiki. Editing a page on a subject is done through forms rather than markup editing. A web database can be tailored into a web application to provide specific user groups a contextualized approach to the data.

All modeling and development tasks are performed in the web browser. No other development tools are necessary. The server requires Apache, MySQL and PHP. The client works on any standards-compliant web browser on desktops, laptops, tablets, and mobile phones. The layout is automatically adjusted to smaller screens.

The programmatic access to data is done via a virtual object-oriented programming interface which is set up over the schema in a few minutes. It is interpreted rather than generated. Portions of the database can be pulled into memory to accelerate bulk access.

== Features ==
- Browseable data
- High-quality web forms
- Little to no programming
- Development done in the browser, no other tools required
- Client runs in any standard-compliant web browser
- Virtual object-oriented programming interface
- User interface adjusts to screen size
- Supports desktops, laptops, tablets, and mobile phones
- Flexible data modeling

== Challenges ==
- Requires rethinking the development process and dropping many hard learned habits
- Requires a familiarity with two ISO standards ISO 13259 and 19756
- Forms cannot be easily adjusted in layout and behavior
- Server installation difficult and prone to error

== License ==
Topincs can be used in a private network for any purpose for free. The use in a public network is restricted to non-commercial applications.

== See also ==
- Topic Maps
- Rapid application development
- Metamodeling
