= Ontology modularization =

The notion of ontology modularization refers to a methodological principle in ontology engineering. The idea is that an ontology is built in a modular manner, i.e. developed as a set of small modules and later composed to form, and be used as, one modular ontology.

One of the major research meetings on ontology modularization is the International Workshop on Modular Ontologies series.

== See also ==
- Ontology double articulation

== External Links to Past and Future Workshops ==
- Seventh International Workshop on Modular Ontologies (WoMO-13)], A Coruna, Spain, July 2012, co-located with LPNMR 2013.
- Sixth International Workshop on Modular Ontologies (WoMO-12)], Graz, Austria, July 2012, co-located with FOIS 2012 (Proceeding).
- Fifth International Workshop on Modular Ontologies (WoMO-11), Ljubljana, Slovenia, August 2011 (co-located with ESSLLI 2011).
- Fourth International Workshop on Modular Ontologies (WOMO-10), held at Toronto, Canada, May 11, 2010 (co-located with FOIS 2010).
- International Workshop on Ontologies: Reasoning and Modularity (WORM-08). Tenerife, Spain, June 2, 2008, co-located with ESWC 2008 (Proceeding).
- Second International Workshop on Modular Ontologies (WOMO-07), October 28, 2007. Whistler, British Columbia, Canada, co-located with K-Cap 2007 (Proceeding).
- First International Workshop on Modular Ontologies (WOMO-06), November 5, 2006, Athens, Georgia, USA, co-located with ISWC 2006 (Proceeding).
