= Hozo =

- Developers: Department of Knowledge Systems (Mizoguchi Laboratory), ISIR-Osaka University, Enegate Co, Ltd
- Website: www.hozo.jp

Hozo is a graphical ontology editor especially created to produce heavy-weight ontologies. It was developed in Japan through a partnership between the Department of Knowledge Systems (Mizoguchi Laboratory), ISIR-Osaka University, and Enegate Co, Ltd.
