= Mark Musen =

Researcher, Stanford University

- Education: Brown University; Alpert Medical School; Stanford University
- Known for: Protégé
- Scientific career
- Fields: Biomedical informatics

Mark Alan Musen is a Professor of Biomedical Informatics and of Biomedical Data Science at Stanford University, and Division Director of the Stanford Center for Biomedical Informatics Research. Musen's research focuses on open science, data stewardship, intelligent systems, and biomedical decision support. Since the late 1980s, Musen has led the development of Protégé, which is currently the most "widely used domain-independent, freely available, platform-independent technology for developing and managing terminologies, ontologies, and knowledge bases" in a range of application domains.

Musen is the founding co-editor in chief of the journal Applied Ontology.

== Education ==
Musen received a Bachelor of Science in biology from Brown University in 1977. He attended Brown's Alpert Medical School, graduating in 1980 with an M.D. Musen completed his residency in internal medicine at Stanford University Medical Center in 1983. After residency, he completed a doctoral degree in Medical Information Sciences at Stanford in 1988.

== Career ==
Between 1988 and 1995, Musen was an Assistant Professor of Medicine at Stanford University School of Medicine. He was appointed Director of the Stanford Center for Biomedical Informatics Research in 1993 and promoted to Professor of Medicine in 2002.
