= Notation3 =

Compact non-XML format for RDF models

- Filename extension: .n3
- Internet media type: text/n3;charset=utf-8
- Developed by: Tim Berners-Lee
- Type of format: semantic web
- Container for: RDF data
- Standard: n3
- Website: www.w3.org/TeamSubmission/n3/

Notation3, or N3 as it is more commonly known, is a shorthand non-XML serialization of Resource Description Framework models, designed with human-readability in mind: N3 is much more compact and readable than XML RDF notation. The format is being developed by Tim Berners-Lee and others from the Semantic Web community. A formalization of the logic underlying N3 was published by Berners-Lee and others in 2008.

N3 has several features that go beyond a serialization for RDF models, such as support for RDF-based rules. Turtle is a simplified, RDF-only subset of N3.

== Examples ==
The following is an RDF model in standard XML notation:

<rdf:RDF
    xmlns:rdf="http://www.w3.org/1999/02/22-rdf-syntax-ns#"
    xmlns:dc="http://purl.org/dc/elements/1.1/">
  <rdf:Description rdf:about="https://en.wikipedia.org/wiki/Tony_Benn">
    <dc:title>Tony Benn</dc:title>
    <dc:publisher>Wikipedia</dc:publisher>
  </rdf:Description>
</rdf:RDF>

may be written in Notation3 like this:

@prefix dc: <http://purl.org/dc/elements/1.1/>.

<https://en.wikipedia.org/wiki/Tony_Benn>
  dc:title "Tony Benn";
  dc:publisher "Wikipedia".

This N3 code above would also be in valid Turtle syntax.

== Comparison of Notation3, Turtle, and N-Triples ==
Feature		Notation3	Turtle	N-Triples
Character encoding		UTF-8		ASCII
Directives	@base	Yes	Yes	No
Directives	@forAll	Yes	No	No
Directives	@forSome	Yes	No	No
Directives	@keywords	Yes	No	No
Directives	@prefix	Yes	Yes	No
Lists
Lists	() (DAML lists)	Yes	Yes	No
Lists	{ … } (statement lists)	Yes	No	No
Literals	true / false (Boolean)	Yes	Yes	No
Literals	xsd:decimal (decimal arbitrary length)	Yes	Yes	No
Literals	xsd:double (decimal double)	Yes	Yes	No
Literals	xsd:integer (decimal integer)	Yes	Yes	No
Syntactic sugar	RDF paths	Yes	No	No
Syntactic sugar	QNames	Yes	Yes	No
Syntactic sugar	a/@a (equiv. to rdf:type)	Yes	Yes	No
Syntactic sugar	[] (shorthand for blank node)	Yes	Yes	No
Syntactic sugar	=> (x implies y)	Yes	No	No
Syntactic sugar	<= (y implies x)	Yes	No	No
Syntactic sugar	= (x is equivalent to y)	Yes	No	No
Syntactic sugar	, (repeat object in list)	Yes	Yes	No
Syntactic sugar	; (repeat subject/verb in list)	Yes	Yes	No

== See also ==
- N-Triples
- Turtle (syntax)
