= Platform for Internet Content Selection =

The Platform for Internet Content Selection (PICS) was a specification created by W3C that used metadata to label webpages to help parents and teachers control what children and students could access on the Internet. The W3C Protocol for Web Description Resources project integrates PICS concepts with RDF. PICS was superseded by POWDER, which itself is no longer actively developed. PICS often used content labeling from the Internet Content Rating Association, which has also been discontinued by the Family Online Safety Institute's board of directors. An alternative self-rating system, named Voluntary Content Rating, was devised by Solid Oak Software in 2010, in response to the perceived complexity of PICS.

Internet Explorer 3 was one of the early web browsers to offer support for PICS, released in 1996. Internet Explorer 5 added a feature called approved sites that allowed extra sites to be added to the list in addition to the PICS list when it was being used.

== See also ==
- Network neutrality
- World Wide Web Consortium
