= TriX (serialization format) =

- Internet media type: text/xml
- Type of format: semantic web
- Container for: RDF data
- Extended to: TriX
- Standard: Specification

TriX (Triples in XML) is a serialization format for RDF (Resource Description Framework) graphs. It is an XML format for serializing Named Graphs and RDF Datasets which offers a compact and readable alternative to the XML-based RDF/XML syntax. It was jointly created by HP Labs and Nokia.

It is suggested that those digital artifacts dependent of the serialization format need means to verify immutability, or digital artifacts including datasets, code, texts, and images are not verifiable nor permanent. Embedding cryptographic hash values to applied URIs has been suggested for structured data files such as nano-publications.

== Example ==
<TriX>
  <graph>
    <triple>
      <uri>https://example.org/Bob</uri>
      <uri>https://example.org/wife</uri>
      <uri>https://example.org/Mary</uri>
    </triple>
    <triple>
      <uri>https://example.org/Bob</uri>
      <uri>https://example.org/name</uri>
      <plainLiteral>Bob</plainLiteral>
    </triple>
    <triple>
      <uri>https://example.org/Mary</uri>
      <uri>https://example.org/age</uri>
      <typedLiteral datatype="https://www.w3.org/2001/XMLSchema#integer">32</typedLiteral>
    </triple>
  </graph>
</TriX>
