= Turtle (syntax) =

Format for expressing data in the RDF data model

Terse RDF Triple Language
- Filename extension: .ttl
- Internet media type: text/turtle
- Developed by: Dave Beckett
- Latest release: RDF 1.1 Turtle (REC); 25 February 2014
- Type of format: Semantic Web
- Container for: RDF data
- Extended from: N-Triples, Notation3
- Extended to: TriG
- Website: www.w3.org/TR/turtle/

In computing, Terse RDF Triple Language (Turtle) is a syntax and file format for expressing data in the Resource Description Framework (RDF) data model. Turtle syntax is similar to that of SPARQL, an RDF query language. It is a common data format for storing RDF data, along with N-Triples, JSON-LD and RDF/XML.

RDF represents information using semantic triples, which comprise a subject, predicate, and object. Each item in the triple is expressed as a Web URI. Turtle provides a way to group three URIs to make a triple, and provides ways to abbreviate such information, for example by factoring out common portions of URIs. For example, information about Huckleberry Finn could be expressed as:

<http://example.org/books/Huckleberry_Finn>
   <http://example.org/relation/author>
   <http://example.org/person/Mark_Twain> .

== History ==
Turtle was defined by Dave Beckett as a subset of Tim Berners-Lee and Dan Connolly's Notation3 (N3) language, and a superset of the minimal N-Triples format. Unlike full N3, which has an expressive power that goes much beyond RDF, Turtle can only serialize valid RDF graphs. Turtle is an alternative to RDF/XML, the original syntax and standard for writing RDF. As opposed to RDF/XML, Turtle does not rely on XML and is generally recognized as being more readable and easier to edit manually than its XML counterpart.

SPARQL, the query language for RDF, uses a syntax similar to Turtle for expressing query patterns.

In 2011, a working group of the World Wide Web Consortium (W3C) started working on an updated version of RDF, with the intention of publishing it along with a standardised version of Turtle. This Turtle specification was published as a W3C Recommendation on 25 February 2014.

A significant proportion of RDF toolkits include Turtle parsing and serializing capability. Some examples of such toolkits are Redland, RDF4J, Jena, Python's RDFLib and JavaScript's N3.js.

== Example ==
The following example defines 3 prefixes ("rdf", "dc", and "ex"), and uses them in expressing a statement about the editorship of the RDF/XML document:

@prefix rdf: <http://www.w3.org/1999/02/22-rdf-syntax-ns#> .
@prefix dc: <http://purl.org/dc/elements/1.1/> .
@prefix ex: <http://example.org/stuff/1.0/> .

<http://www.w3.org/TR/rdf-syntax-grammar>
  dc:title "RDF/XML Syntax Specification (Revised)" ;
  ex:editor [
    ex:fullname "Dave Beckett";
    ex:homePage <http://purl.org/net/dajobe/>
  ] .

(Turtle examples are also valid Notation3).

The example encodes an RDF graph made of four triples, which express these facts:

- The W3C technical report on RDF syntax and grammar has the title RDF/XML Syntax Specification (Revised).
- That report's editor is a certain individual, who in turn
  - Has full name Dave Beckett.
  - Has a home page at a certain place.

Here are the triples made explicit in N-Triples notation:

<http://www.w3.org/TR/rdf-syntax-grammar> <http://purl.org/dc/elements/1.1/title> "RDF/XML Syntax Specification (Revised)" .
<http://www.w3.org/TR/rdf-syntax-grammar> <http://example.org/stuff/1.0/editor> _:bnode .
_:bnode <http://example.org/stuff/1.0/fullname> "Dave Beckett" .
_:bnode <http://example.org/stuff/1.0/homePage> <http://purl.org/net/dajobe/> .

The MIME type of Turtle is text/turtle. The character encoding of Turtle content is always UTF-8.

== Named graphs ==
TriG RDF syntax extends Turtle with support for named graphs.

== See also ==
- N-Triples
- Notation3 (N3)
- LV2
