= TriG (syntax) =

Serialization file format for Resource Description Framework graphs

- Filename extension: .trig
- Internet media type: application/trig
- Developed by: Freie Universität Berlin
- Type of format: semantic web
- Container for: RDF data
- Extended from: Turtle
- Standard: W3C Recommendation

TriG is a serialization format for RDF (Resource Description Framework) graphs. It is a plain text format for serializing named graphs and RDF Datasets which offers a compact and readable alternative to the XML-based TriX syntax.

== Example ==
This example encodes three interlinked named graphs:

- http://www.example.org/exampleDocument#G1
- http://www.example.org/exampleDocument#G2
- http://www.example.org/exampleDocument#G3

 @prefix rdf: <http://www.w3.org/1999/02/22-rdf-syntax-ns#> .
 @prefix xsd: <http://www.w3.org/2001/XMLSchema#> .
 @prefix swp: <http://www.w3.org/2004/03/trix/swp-1/> .
 @prefix dc: <http://purl.org/dc/elements/1.1/> .
 @prefix ex: <http://www.example.org/vocabulary#> .
 @prefix : <http://www.example.org/exampleDocument#> .
 
 :G1 { :Monica ex:name "Monica Murphy" .      
       :Monica ex:homepage <http://www.example.org> .
       :Monica ex:email <mailto:monica@example.org> .
       :Monica ex:hasSkill ex:Management }
 
 :G2 { :Monica rdf:type ex:Person .
       :Monica ex:hasSkill ex:Programming }
 
 :G3 { :G1 swp:assertedBy _:w1 .
       _:w1 swp:authority :Chris .
       _:w1 dc:date "2003-10-02"^^xsd:date .   
       :G2 swp:quotedBy _:w2 .
       :G3 swp:assertedBy _:w2 .
       _:w2 dc:date "2003-09-03"^^xsd:date .
       _:w2 swp:authority :Chris .
       :Chris rdf:type ex:Person .
       :Chris ex:email <mailto:chris@example.com> }
