= Ontology double articulation =

Ontology double articulation refers to the methodological principle in ontology engineering, that an ontology should be built as separate domain axiomatizations and application axiomatizations. According to this principle, an application axiomatization should be built in terms of (i.e. commits to) a domain axiomatization. While a domain axiomatization focuses on the characterization of the intended meaning (i.e. intended models) of a vocabulary at the domain level, application axiomatizations mainly focus on the usability of this vocabulary according to certain application/usability perspectives. An application axiomatization is intended to specify the legal models (a subset of the intended models) of the applications interest. This enables reuse of domain knowledge, use of application knowledge, and interoperability of applications. See (Jarrar 2005, Jarrar 2006, Jarrar and Meersman 2007).

== See also ==
- Ontology modularization
