= QName =

Fully qualified name of an element, attribute, or identifier in an XML document

A QName, or qualified name, is the fully qualified name of an element, attribute, or identifier in an XML document. A QName concisely associates the URI of an XML namespace with the local name of an element, attribute, or identifier in that namespace. To make this association, the QName assigns the local name a prefix that corresponds to its namespace. In all, the QName comprises the URI of the XML namespace, the prefix, and the local name.

The World Wide Web Consortium introduced the QName convention in the 1999 specification "Namespaces in XML".

== Purpose ==
Since URI references can be long and may contain prohibited characters for element/attribute naming, QNames are used to create a mapping between the URI and a namespace prefix. The mapping enables the abbreviation of URIs, therefore it achieves a more convenient way to write XML documents (see example below).

== Formal definition ==
QNames are formally defined by the W3C as:

QName	           ::=   PrefixedName | UnprefixedName
PrefixedName	   ::=   Prefix ':' LocalPart
UnprefixedName     ::=   LocalPart
Prefix	           ::=   NCName
LocalPart          ::=   NCName

NCName is defined as follows:

NCName	           ::=   Name - (Char* ':' Char*)  (* An XML Name, minus the ":" *)
Name	           ::=   NameStartChar (NameChar)*
NameStartChar	   ::=   ":" | [A-Z] | "_" | [a-z] | [#xC0-#xD6] | [#xD8-#xF6] 
                         | [#xF8-#x2FF] | [#x370-#x37D] | [#x37F-#x1FFF]  
                         | [#x200C-#x200D] | [#x2070-#x218F] | [#x2C00-#x2FEF] 
                         | [#x3001-#xD7FF] | [#xF900-#xFDCF] | [#xFDF0-#xFFFD] 
                         | [#x10000-#xEFFFF]
NameChar           ::=   NameStartChar | "-" | "." | [0-9] 
                         | #xB7 | [#x0300-#x036F] | [#x203F-#x2040]
Char	           ::=   (* any Unicode char, excluding surrogate blocks FFFE and FFFF. *)
                         #x9 | #xA | #xD | [#x20-#xD7FF] 
                         | [#xE000-#xFFFD] | [#x10000-#x10FFFF]

Whereby the Prefix is used as placeholder for the namespace and the LocalPart as the local part of the qualified name. A local part can be an attribute name or an element name.

== Example ==
<?xml version="1.0"?>
<doc xmlns:x="https://example.com/ns/foo">
  <x:p/>
</doc>

In line two the prefix "x" is declared to be associated with the URI "http://example.com/ns/foo". This prefix can further on be used as abbreviation for this namespace. Subsequently, the tag "x:p" is a valid QName because it uses the "x" as namespace reference and "p" as local part. The tag "doc" is also a valid QName, but it consists only of a local part.

== See also ==
- CURIE: Compact URI
- Fully qualified name
