= Protégé (software) =

Ontology editor

- Developer: Stanford Center for Biomedical Informatics Research
- Release: 11 November 1999; 26 years ago
- Stable release: 5.6.9 / 7 March 2026; 7 months ago
- Preview release: 6.0.0
- Written in: Java
- Operating system: Linux, Mac OS X & Windows
- Platform: Java VM
- Type: Ontology editor
- License: BSD 2-clause
- Website: protege.stanford.edu
- Repository: github.com/protegeproject/protege

Protégé is a free, open source ontology editor and a knowledge management system. The Protégé meta-tool was first built by Mark Musen in 1987 and has since been developed by a team at Stanford University. The software is the most popular and widely used ontology editor in the world.

== Overview ==
Protégé provides a graphical user interface to define ontologies. It also includes deductive classifiers to validate that models are consistent and to infer new information based on the analysis of an ontology. Like Eclipse, Protégé is a framework for which various other projects suggest plugins. This application is written in Java and makes heavy use of Swing to create the user interface. According to their website, there are over 300,000 registered users. A 2009 book calls it "the leading ontological engineering tool".

Protégé is developed at Stanford University and is made available under the BSD 2-clause license. Earlier versions of the tool were developed in collaboration with the University of Manchester.

== See also ==
- OWL and RDF
- Semantic technology
