= RDF/XML =

Syntax to display a metadata format as XML

- Filename extension: .rdf
- Internet media type: application/rdf+xml
- Developed by: World Wide Web Consortium
- Initial release: 2012
- Latest release: 1.1; 24 February 2014; 11 years ago
- Type of format: Semantic Web
- Container for: RDF data
- Extended from: XML
- Standard: Specification

RDF/XML is a syntax, defined by the W3C, to express (i.e., serialize) an RDF graph as an XML document. RDF/XML is sometimes misidentified as simply RDF because it was introduced alongside the other W3C specifications defining RDF and was historically the first W3C official RDF serialization format.

RDF/XML is the primary exchange syntax for OWL 2, and must be supported by all OWL 2 tools.
