= Croissant (metadata format) =

Metadata format for datasets in machine learning

Croissant is a metadata format design to support sharing of datasets for machine learning applications. It is a platform-agnostic schema used to standardize metadata in data repositories like Hugging Face, kaggle, Dataverse and OpenML.

== Structure ==
Croissant builds upon schema.org, uses primarily JSON-LD, and divides metadata in four "layers": Dataset Metadata, Resource, Structure and Semantic:

- The Dataset Metadata layer constrains which schema.org properties should be used, including additional properties, linking together the resources (files) of the dataset with general metadata, like licensing and citation information.
- The Resource layer describes the individual files and sets of those using two new classes, FileObject and FileSet. A FileSet may be a collection of related images.
- The Structure layer specifies how the files are organized in the dataset. A RecordSet class describes how resources are present, configurations that may very a lot between modality. This specification facilitates interoperability of the datasets.
- Finally, the Semantic layer adds information for practical reuse of the dataset, such as splits for train, test and validation subsets.

It also provides a default extension for metadata related to responsible AI.

The use of a standard machine-readable structure increases, for example, the discoverability of datasets in search engines such as Google Dataset Search.

== History ==
Croissant was shared in arXiv in March 2024 and published in the proceedings of NeurIPS 2024. It started as community driven as a MLCommons Croissant Working Group, including stakeholders organizations from academia and industry, including Google, the open data institute, Sage Bionetworks and King's College London.

Variations of Croissant are developed to support datasets in different areas of research, such as Geo-Croissant for geospatial datasets. Other technical extensions, such as support for RDF, soon followed.

In May 2026, a library called "Croissant Baker" was shared in arXiv, providing support for automatic metadata generation from specialized file formats like FHIR, NIfTI and DICOM.
