= GoodRelations =

- Abbreviation: schema
- Year started: 2001
- Base standards: URI, OWL, RDFa
- Related standards: Microformat, RDFS, N-Triples, Turtle, JSON, JSON-LD, CSV
- Domain: Semantic Web
- License: CC-BY-SA 3.0
- Website: purl.org/goodrelations/

GoodRelations is a Web Ontology Language-compliant ontology for Semantic Web online data, dealing with business-related goods and services. It handles the individual relationships between a buyer, a seller and the products and services offered. In November 2012, it was integrated into the Schema.org ontology.

== Usage ==
GoodRelations became popular owing to its success in improving search engine results.

By 2009, the ontology's Product concept was being used to describe over a million products and their prices. By 2013, GoodRelations had been adopted by the search engines Yahoo!, Google, and Bing. An analysis of online e-commerce data providers at that time found it to be the most prevalent ontology in use. As of mid-2015, GoodRelations had become the de facto ontology for e-commerce, and was in widespread use, having been adopted by retailers such as Best Buy.

GoodRelations is additionally used in academic studies of the Semantic Web, as a core ontology.

== Example ==
A shop, restaurant, or store, and its opening hours, may be specified using GoodRelations as in this example, which also uses vCard and FOAF:

<div xmlns:rdf="http://www.w3.org/1999/02/22-rdf-syntax-ns#"
     xmlns="http://www.w3.org/1999/xhtml"
     xmlns:foaf="http://xmlns.com/foaf/0.1/"
     xmlns:gr="http://purl.org/goodrelations/v1#"
     xmlns:vcard="http://www.w3.org/2006/vcard/ns#"
     xmlns:xsd="http://www.w3.org/2001/XMLSchema#">

  <div about="#store" typeof="gr:Location">
    <div property="gr:name" content="Pizzeria La Mamma"></div>
    <div rel="vcard:adr">
      <div typeof="vcard:Address">
        <div property="vcard:country-name" content="Germany"></div>
        <div property="vcard:locality" content="Munich"></div>
        <div property="vcard:postal-code" content="85577"></div>
        <div property="vcard:street-address" content="1234 Main Street"></div>
      </div>
    </div>
    <div property="vcard:tel" content="+33 408 970-6104"></div>
    <div rel="foaf:depiction" resource="http://www.pizza-la-mamma.com/image_or_logo.png">
    </div>
    <div rel="vcard:geo">
      <div>
        <div property="vcard:latitude" content="48.08" datatype="xsd:float"></div>
        <div property="vcard:longitude" content="11.64" datatype="xsd:float"></div>
      </div>
    </div>
    <div rel="gr:hasOpeningHoursSpecification">
      <div about="#mon_fri" typeof="gr:OpeningHoursSpecification">
        <div property="gr:opens" content="08:00:00" datatype="xsd:time"></div>
        <div property="gr:closes" content="18:00:00" datatype="xsd:time"></div>
        <div rel="gr:hasOpeningHoursDayOfWeek"
             resource="http://purl.org/goodrelations/v1#Friday"></div>
        <div rel="gr:hasOpeningHoursDayOfWeek"
             resource="http://purl.org/goodrelations/v1#Thursday"></div>
        <div rel="gr:hasOpeningHoursDayOfWeek"
             resource="http://purl.org/goodrelations/v1#Wednesday"></div>
        <div rel="gr:hasOpeningHoursDayOfWeek"
             resource="http://purl.org/goodrelations/v1#Tuesday"></div>
        <div rel="gr:hasOpeningHoursDayOfWeek"
             resource="http://purl.org/goodrelations/v1#Monday"></div>
      </div>
    </div>
    <div rel="gr:hasOpeningHoursSpecification">
      <div about="#sat" typeof="gr:OpeningHoursSpecification">
        <div property="gr:opens" content="08:30:00" datatype="xsd:time"></div>
        <div property="gr:closes" content="14:00:00" datatype="xsd:time"></div>
        <div rel="gr:hasOpeningHoursDayOfWeek"
             resource="http://purl.org/goodrelations/v1#Saturday"></div>
      </div>
    </div>
    <div rel="foaf:page" resource=""></div>
  </div>
</div>
