= Sorbonne declaration =

The Sorbonne declaration may refer to either:

- The Sorbonne Declaration (1998), part of the Bologna Process relating to higher education.
- The Sorbonne declaration on research data rights (2020), a declaration in support of FAIR data.
