= FAIR data =

Data that is findable, accessible, interoperable, and reusable

An introduction to FAIR data and persistent identifiers.

FAIR data is data which meets the 2016 FAIR principles of findability, accessibility, interoperability, and reusability, first formally published in 2016 .

The FAIR principles emphasise machine-actionability — the capacity of computational systems to find, access, interoperate, and reuse data with none or minimal human intervention — because humans increasingly rely on computational support to deal with data as a result of the increase in the volume, complexity, and rate of production of data. The principles were designed to apply not only to data in the conventional sense, but also to the algorithms, tools, and workflows that led to that data: all scholarly digital research objects benefit from application of these principles, since all components of the research process must be available to ensure transparency, reproducibility, and reusability.

The abbreviation FAIR/O data is sometimes used to indicate that the dataset or database in question complies with the FAIR principles and also carries an explicit data‑capable open license.

== FAIR principles published by GO FAIR ==
=== Findable ===
The first step in (re)using data is to find them. Metadata and data should be easy to find for both humans and computers. Machine-readable metadata are essential for automatic discovery of datasets and services:

- F1. (Meta)data are assigned a globally unique and persistent identifier
- F2. Data are described with rich metadata (defined by R1 below)
- F3. Metadata clearly and explicitly include the identifier of the data they describe
- F4. (Meta)data are registered or indexed in a searchable resource

=== Accessible ===
Once the user finds the required data, they need to know how it can be accessed, possibly including authentication and authorisation:

- A1. (Meta)data are retrievable by their identifier using a standardised communications protocol
- A1.1 The protocol is open, free, and universally implementable
- A1.2 The protocol allows for an authentication and authorisation procedure, where necessary
- A2. Metadata are accessible, even when the data are no longer available

=== Interoperable ===
The data usually need to be integrated with other data. In addition, the data need to interoperate with applications or workflows for analysis, storage, and processing:

- I1. (Meta)data use a formal, accessible, shared, and broadly applicable language for knowledge representation
- I2. (Meta)data use vocabularies that follow FAIR principles
- I3. (Meta)data include qualified references to other (meta)data

=== Reusable ===
The ultimate goal of FAIR is to optimise the reuse of data. To achieve this, metadata and data should be well-described so that they can be replicated and/or combined in different settings:

- R1. (Meta)data are richly described with a plurality of accurate and relevant attributes
- R1.1. (Meta)data are released with a clear and accessible data usage license
- R1.2. (Meta)data are associated with detailed provenance
- R1.3. (Meta)data meet domain-relevant community standards

The principles refer to three types of entities: data (or any digital object), metadata (information about that digital object), and infrastructure. For instance, principle F4 defines that both metadata and data are registered or indexed in a searchable resource (the infrastructure component).

== Origins and publication ==
Good data management is not a goal in itself, but rather is the key conduit leading to knowledge discovery and innovation, and to subsequent data and knowledge integration and reuse by the community after the data publication process. Science funders, publishers and governmental agencies have increasingly required data management and stewardship plans for data generated in publicly funded experiments.

Before FAIR, a 2007 OECD report was the most influential paper discussing similar ideas related to data accessibility. In January 2014, the Lorentz Centre at Leiden University hosted a workshop entitled "Jointly designing a data FAIRPORT" where participants first formulated the FAIR principles. A dedicated FAIR working group, established by members of the FORCE11 community, subsequently fine-tuned and improved the principles. They were published in the March 2016 issue of Scientific Data.

== The significance of machines ==
A distinctive emphasis of the FAIR principles, compared with many peer initiatives, is the attention paid equally to human-driven and machine-driven activities. Humans and machines face distinct barriers when attempting to find and process data on the web. Humans have an intuitive sense of semantics — the meaning or intent of a digital object — because they are capable of identifying and interpreting contextual cues. Their primary limitation, however, is that they are unable to operate at the scope, scale, and speed necessitated by contemporary scientific data. For this reason, humans increasingly rely on computational agents to undertake discovery and integration tasks on their behalf.

The phrase ‘machine actionable’ indicates a continuum of possible states wherein a digital object provides increasingly more detailed information to an autonomously-acting computational data explorer. The optimal state — where machines fully understand and can autonomously and correctly operate on a digital object — may rarely be achieved. Nevertheless, the FAIR principles provide steps along a path toward machine-actionability. Adopting the FAIR principles in whole or in part leads a resource along this continuum toward the optimal state.

== FAIR maturity levels ==
The FAIR principles are intentionally conceptual and do not prescribe specific means or guidelines for implementation. This presents a challenge when evaluating the FAIRness of digital objects, since the principles can be applied to any level of the digital asset: metadata, data, or associated data services.

The Research Data Alliance (RDA) FAIR Data Maturity Model Working Group published a specification in 2020 that breaks down the FAIR principles into 41 indicators, adding context and specificity to each principle for both the data and metadata parts, with additional indicators for machine-readability and community adoption where applicable.

Building on this, the European Commission’s Joint Research Centre (JRC) published FAIR Data Guidelines in 2025 that organise these indicators into five progressive maturity levels specific to the JRC data ecosystem. These levels are designed not as a grading scale but as a practical framework to help data publishers assess what actions are necessary and what further steps are available:

• FAIR start — the baseline level. Data is published in a data catalogue with mandatory metadata elements recorded. Findability and accessibility are addressed through institutional platforms. Data itself may not be structured for machine reuse.

• FAIR play — builds on the baseline by adding links between datasets and related resources (publications, source data, versions, visualisations), enriching metadata provenance and cross-referencing.

• FAIR go — data is encoded and structured using relevant community standards, explicitly declared in metadata. Data models and terminologies are defined, though not necessarily in machine-readable form; data dictionaries and textual descriptions are acceptable at this level.

• FAIR share — data models are machine-readable (e.g., using JSON Schema, XML Schema, SHACL, ShEx), and data terms refer to machine-readable data dictionaries. Provenance is richly documented, including source data and transformation processes.

• FAIRest of them all — the highest level. The data model is machine-readable and endorsed and maintained by the relevant scientific domain community. Terms and concepts are exposed using FAIR vocabularies shared by that community, enabling maximum interoperability and reuse by machine agents.

The JRC guidelines note that making data FAIR is not a static operation. Digital assets that are FAIR at a given point in time can change their status in line with technological and societal transformations. Standards, platforms, protocols and other factors may lower data’s FAIRness level over time if not actively maintained. The guidelines also acknowledge that not all datasets need to strive for the highest maturity level; the appropriate level depends on the mandate under which data is curated and the expected scope of reuse.

== Acceptance and implementation ==
At the 2016 G20 Hangzhou summit, the G20 leaders issued a statement endorsing the application of FAIR principles to research. Also in 2016, a group of Australian organisations developed a Statement on FAIR Access to Australia's Research Outputs, which aimed to extend the principles to research outputs more generally. In 2017, Germany, Netherlands and France agreed to establish an international office to support the FAIR initiative, the GO FAIR International Support and Coordination Office.

"Implementing FAIR Data Principles – The Role of Libraries", a guide

Other international organisations active in the research data ecosystem, such as CODATA or Research Data Alliance (RDA) also support FAIR implementations by their communities. FAIR principles implementation assessment is being explored by FAIR Data Maturity Model Working Group of RDA, CODATA's strategic Decadal Programme "Data for Planet: Making data work for cross-domain challenges" mentions FAIR data principles as a fundamental enabler of data driven science. The Association of European Research Libraries recommends the use of FAIR principles.

The European Commission's European Strategy for Data identifies FAIR principles as a key means to accomplish a more harmonised description and overview of datasets and to foster data interoperability. All recipients of Horizon Europe funding are required to abide by guidelines on open data; specifically, all data produced in this framework must be FAIR by default.

In January 2020, representatives of nine groups of universities around the world produced the Sorbonne declaration on research data rights, which included a commitment to FAIR data, and called on governments to provide support to enable it. In 2021, researchers identified the FAIR principles as a conceptual component of data catalog software tools, with the other components being metadata management, business context and data responsibility roles. In April 2022, Matthias Scheffler and colleagues argued in Nature that FAIR principles are "a must" so that data mining and artificial intelligence can extract useful scientific information from the data. There have been moves in the geosciences to establish FAIR data by use of decimal georeferencing

A 2017 paper by advocates of FAIR data reported that awareness of the FAIR concept was increasing among various researchers and institutes, but also, understanding of the concept was becoming confused as different people apply their own differing perspectives to it.

Guides on implementing FAIR data practices state that the cost of a data management plan in compliance with FAIR data practices should be 5% of the total research budget.

== Complementary frameworks ==
In 2019, the Global Indigenous Data Alliance (GIDA) released the CARE Principles for Indigenous Data Governance as a complementary guide. The CARE principles extend the FAIR framework to include Collective benefit, Authority to control, Responsibility, and Ethics, ensuring data guidelines address historical contexts and power differentials. The CARE Principles were drafted at the International Data Week and Research Data Alliance Plenary co-hosted event held in Gaborone, Botswana in November 2018.

The European Open Science Cloud (EOSC) has also become an important member of the FAIR community. One of the Strategic Objectives of the EOSC Association is to make publicly financed research data FAIR by default.

== Challenges in implementation ==
Making data (and research outcomes) FAIR is a challenging task, and it is challenging to assess FAIRness. In 2020, the Data Maturity Model Working Group FAIR published a set of guidelines for assessing FAIRness. Numerous evaluation tools have subsequently been developed, including the FAIR Maturity Evaluation Service (FAIRSharing) and the F-UJI Automated FAIR Data Assessment Tool] (FAIRsFAIR).

Interoperability is particularly complex. It requires addressing different issues: from systems being able to communicate via networking infrastructure, to being able to interpret encoding formats, to understanding the meaning of exchanged data. Not all data can use the same encoding format due to inherent characteristics of different data types, and even when they share the same format, their structures and semantics may differ. For similar types of data, adopting the same domain-relevant community standards is the most effective approach to improving interoperability.

Controlled FAIR vocabularies play a pivotal role in enhancing interoperability. These structured sets of terms and concepts, tailored to specific communities or disciplines, serve as a lingua franca that facilitates data exchange among diverse stakeholders. By establishing common terminology and definitions, these vocabularies minimise ambiguity and ensure that information is interpreted consistently across different systems and applications. More complex vocabularies like thesauri, taxonomies and ontologies can unlock deeper insights that transcend the original context for which the data was created.

There have also been moves in the geosciences to establish FAIR data through the use of decimal georeferencing. Researchers identified the FAIR principles as a conceptual component of data catalog software tools, alongside metadata management, business context and data responsibility roles.

== See also ==
- Data management
- Open access
- Open data – datasets and databases carrying an explicit data‑capable open license
- Open science
- Remix culture
