= Google Dataset Search =

Search engine for datasets from Google

Google Dataset Search is a search engine from Google that helps researchers locate online data that is freely available for use. The company launched the service on September 5, 2018, and stated that the product was targeted at scientists and data journalists. The service was out of beta as of January 23, 2020.

Google Dataset Search complements Google Scholar, the company's search engine for academic studies and reports.

== Features ==
Dataset Search can filter results based on the desired type of data (for example, focusing on images or text). It is also available in mobile.

== Technology ==
Dataset Search is heavily reliant on dataset providers' use of metadata in accordance with the standards defined by the schema.org consortium. According to the Google AI blog,

When Google's search engine processes a Web page with schema.org/Dataset mark-up, it understands that there is dataset metadata there and processes that structured metadata to create "records" describing each annotated dataset on a page. The use of schema.org allows developers to embed this structured information into HTML, without affecting the appearance of the page while making the semantics of the information visible to all search engines.

== Versions ==
Dataset Search was initially released in beta on September 5, 2018. It moved out of beta on January 23, 2020.
