= Schema.org =

Project for creating structured data

- Abbreviation: schema
- Year started: 2011; 15 years ago
- Latest version: 30.1; 15 September 2026
- Organization: Google, Yahoo!, Microsoft, Yandex
- Base standards: URI, HTML5, RDF, Microdata, ISO 8601
- Related standards: RDFa, Microformat, RDFS, OWL, N-Triples, Turtle, JSON, JSON-LD, CSV
- Domain: Semantic Web
- License: CC-BY-SA 3.0
- Website: schema.org

Schema.org is a reference website that publishes documentation and guidelines for using structured data mark-up on web-pages (in the form of microdata, RDFa or JSON-LD). Its main objective is to standardize HTML tags to be used by webmasters for creating rich results (displayed as visual data or infographic tables on search engine results) about a certain topic of interest. It is a part of the semantic web project, which aims to make document mark-up codes more readable and meaningful to both humans and machines.

== History ==
Schema.org is an initiative launched on June 2, 2011, by Bing, Google and Yahoo! (operators of the world's largest search engines at that time) to create and support a common set of schemas for structured data markup on web pages. In November 2011, Yandex (whose search engine is the largest in Russia) joined the initiative. They propose using the schema.org vocabulary along with the Microdata, RDFa, or JSON-LD formats to mark up website content with metadata about itself. Such markup can be recognized by search engine spiders and other parsers, thus granting access to the meaning of the sites (see Semantic Web). The initiative also describes an extension mechanism for adding additional properties. In 2012, the GoodRelations ontology was integrated into Schema.org. Public discussion of the initiative largely takes place on the W3C public vocabularies mailing list.

Much of the vocabulary on Schema.org was inspired by earlier formats, such as microformats, FOAF, and OpenCyc. Microformats, with its most dominant representative hCard, continue (as of 2015) to be published widely on the web, where the deployment of Schema.org has strongly increased between 2012 and 2014. In 2015, Google began supporting the JSON-LD format, and as of September, 2017 recommended using JSON-LD for structured data whenever possible.

Despite the advantages of using Schema.org, adoption remained limited as of 2016. A survey in 2016 of 300 US-based marketing agencies and B2C advertisers across industries showing only 17% uptake. As of 2024 over 45 million web domains have used schema markup on their web pages.

Validators, such as the deprecated Google Structured Data Testing Tool, or more recent Google Rich Results Test Tool, Schema.org Markup Validator, Yandex Microformat validator, and Bing Markup Validator can be used to test the validity of the data marked up with the schemas and Microdata. More recently, Google Search Console (formerly webmaster tools) has provided a report section for unparsable structured data. If any Schema code on a website is incorrect, it will show in this report. Some schema markups such as Organization and Person are commonly used to influence search results returned by Google's Knowledge Graph.

The popularity of Schema.org has served for its use as a base for other schemas, such as the Croissant specification for machine-learning datasets.

== Schema types ==
Schema vocabulary includes sets of types, each of which have related metadata properties that can be illustrated using predefined enumerations and Datatypes. Types are managed by schema.org and are regularly updated. As of June 2026, there are over 823 schema types. There are a number of subjects and elements that a web page can be marked up with using a Schema, with examples including:

- Article
- Breadcrumb
- Course
- Event
- FAQ
- LocalBusiness
- Logo
- Movie
- Product
- Recipe
- Review
- Video
- Book
- Clip
- Contactpoint
- HowTo
- Offer

== Examples ==
Diagram of the Schema.org Person type

=== Microdata ===
The following is an example of how to mark up information about a movie and its director using the Schema.org schemas and microdata. In order to mark up the data, the attribute itemtype along with the URL of the schema is used. The attribute itemscope defines the scope of the itemtype. The kind of the current item can be defined by using the attribute itemprop.

<div itemscope itemtype="http://schema.org/Movie">
  <h1 itemprop="name">Avatar</h1>
  <div itemprop="director" itemscope itemtype="http://schema.org/Person">
  Director: <span itemprop="name">James Cameron</span>
(born <time itemprop="birthDate" datetime="1954-08-16">August 16, 1954</time>)
  </div>
  <span itemprop="genre">Science fiction</span>
  <a href="../movies/avatar-theatrical-trailer.html" itemprop="trailer">Trailer</a>
</div>

=== RDFa 1.1 Lite ===
<section>
  <h1 property="name">Avatar</h1>
  <div property="director" typeof="Person">
  Director: <span property="name">James Cameron</span>
(born <time property="birthDate" datetime="1954-08-16">August 16, 1954</time>)
  </div>
  <span property="genre">Science fiction</span>
  <a href="../movies/avatar-theatrical-trailer.html" property="trailer">Trailer</a>
</section>

=== JSON-LD ===
<script type="application/ld+json">
{ 
  "@context": "http://schema.org/",
  "@type": "Movie",
  "name": "Avatar",
  "director":
    {
       "@type": "Person",
       "name": "James Cameron",
       "birthDate": "1954-08-16"
    },
  "genre": "Science fiction",
  "trailer": "../movies/avatar-theatrical-trailer.html"
}
</script>

== Schema.org Usage Statistics ==
In June 2026, the Google and Schema.org community announced schema.org usage statistics for the first time. It was published publicly in the official Schema.org GitHub repository in CSV and JSON formats. Schema.org invited other crawlers and indexers to contribute their own statistics to this initiative using the same open format.

This dataset is updated monthly and shows Schema.org term usage across millions of domains. To respect privacy, the counts are aggregated at the domain level and presented in popularity-range buckets.
