= LamaH =

Cross-state initiative for unified data preparation and collection

- Type: Cross-state initiative
- Field: Hydrology
- Main application(s): Creating flood forecasting models

LamaH (Large-Sample Data for Hydrology and Environmental Sciences) is a cross-state initiative for unified data preparation and collection in the field of catchment hydrology. Hydrological datasets, for example, are an integral component for creating flood forecasting models.

== Features ==
LamaH datasets always consist of a combination of meteorological time series (e.g., precipitation, temperature) and hydrologically relevant catchment attributes (e.g., elevation, slope, forest area, soil, bedrock) aggregated over the respective catchment as well as associated hydrological time series at the catchment outlet (discharge). By evaluating the large and heterogeneous sample (large-sample) of catchments, it is possible to gain insights into the hydrological cycle that would probably not be achievable with local and small-scale studies. The structure of the dataset allows an evaluation based on machine learning methods (deep learning). The accompanying paper explains not only the data preparation but also any limitations, uncertainties and possible applications.

== Difference to CAMELS ==
The LamaH datasets are quite similar to the CAMELS datasets, but additionally feature:

- Further basin delineations (based on intermediate catchments) and attributes (e.g. flow distance and altitude difference between two topologically adjacent discharge gauges), enabling the setup of an interconnected hydrological network
- Attributes for classifying catchments and runoff gauges according to the degree and type of (anthropogenic) influence

== Availability ==
LamaH datasets are available for the following regions:

- Central Europe (Austria and its hydrological upstream areas in Germany, Czech Republic, Switzerland, Slovakia, Italy, Liechtenstein, Slovenia and Hungary) / 859 catchments

CAMELS datasets are available for (ranked by publication date):

- Contiguous USA (exclusive Alaska and Hawaii) / 671 catchments
- Chile / 516 catchments
- Brazil / 897 catchments
- Great Britain / 671 catchments
- Australia / 222 catchments

Both the CAMELS and LamaH datasets are licensed with Creative Commons and are therefore available barrier-free for the public.
