= ShEx =

Language for validating, describing or transforming RDF graphs

ShEx - Shape Expressions
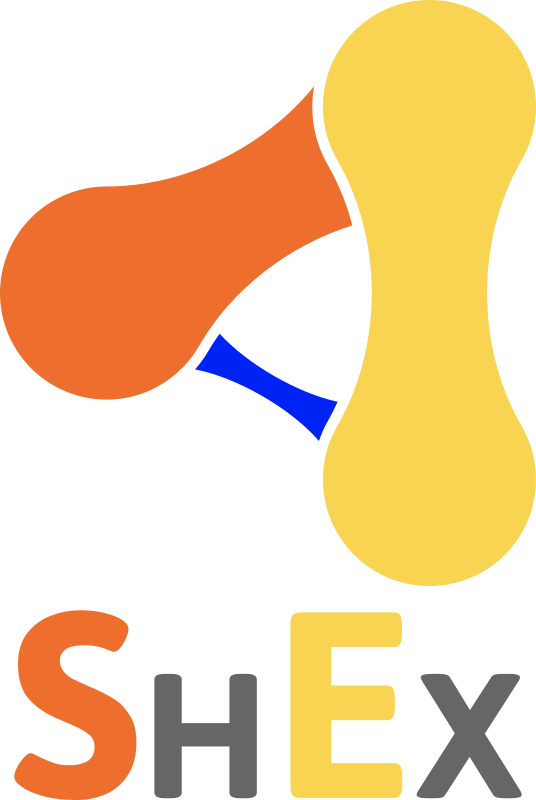
- Paradigm: Data Validation
- Designed by: Eric Prud'hommeaux, Iovka Boneva, Jose Emilio Labra Gayo, Gregg Kellogg, Shape Expressions W3C Community Group
- Stable release: 2.1 / November 21, 2018; 7 years ago
- Scope: Semantic Web
- Implementation language: JavaScript, Scala
- Filename extensions: shex, sx
- Website: www.w3.org/community/shex/

Major implementations
- shex.js, Shaclex

Influenced by
- Turtle, SPARQL, RelaxNG

Influenced
- SHACL

Shape Expressions (ShEx) is a data modelling language for validating and describing a Resource Description Framework (RDF).

It was proposed at the 2012 RDF Validation Workshop as a high-level, concise language for RDF validation.

The shapes can be defined in a human-friendly compact syntax called ShExC or using any RDF serialization formats like JSON-LD or Turtle.

ShEx expressions can be used both to describe RDF and to automatically check the conformance of RDF data. The syntax of ShEx is similar to Turtle and SPARQL while the semantics is inspired by regular expression languages like RelaxNG.

== Example ==
PREFIX :       <http://example.org/>
PREFIX schema: <http://schema.org/>
PREFIX xsd:  <http://www.w3.org/2001/XMLSchema#>

:Person {
 schema:name  xsd:string   ;
 schema:knows @:Person   * ;
}

The previous example declares that nodes conforming to shape Person must have one property schema:name with a string value and zero or more properties schema:knows whose values must conform with shape Person.

== Implementations ==
Project	Programming language	Version	Latest release	Compatible ShEx version	Features						
Project	Programming language	Version	Latest release	Compatible ShEx version	value checking	cardinality	manifest shapemap	imports	external shapes	annotations	semantic actions
ShEx.ex	Elixir	v0.1.4	2020-10-13	?	?	?	?	No	No	No	No
Ruby ShEx	Ruby	0.7.1	2022-01-29	2.0	?	?	?	?	?	?	Yes
shexjava	Java	None	None	2.0	?	?	?	?	?	?	?
PyShEx	Python	v0.9.0	2026-05-07	2.0	Yes	Yes	No	No	?	?	?
entityshape	Python	0.0.2	2023-06-24	?	Yes	Yes	No	No	No	No	No
shaclex	Scala	0.1.70	2020-11-02	?	?	?	?	?	?	?	?
shex.js	JavaScript	v1.0.0-alpha.26	2023-04-25	?	?	?	?	?	?	Yes	?

== Online playgrounds and demos ==
- ShExSimple: Online demo based on shex.js (link rot?)
- rdfshape: online demo based on shaclex

== See also ==
- SHACL
- Wikidata
- XML schemas
