= Peter Fox (professor) =

American data scientist (1959–2021)

Peter Arthur Fox
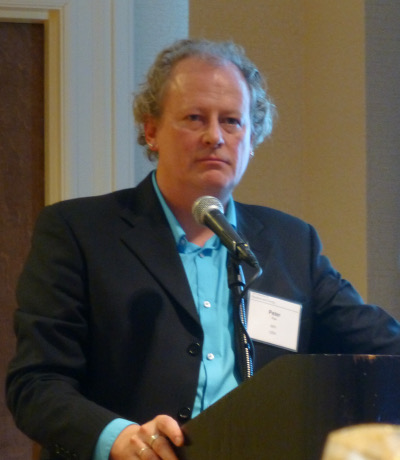
- Key note speaker at Fordham University
- Born: 25 May 1959; Devonport, Tasmania, Australia
- Died: 27 March 2021 (aged 61); Troy, New York, United States
- Citizenship: Australia; Ireland
- Education: Monash University
- Known for: Defining Informatics and Data Science in Earth Sciences, shaping the Sun-Earth Connections Research Agenda and co-convening the Community
- Spouse: Erica Veil
- Awards: EGU Ian McHarg Medal; ESIP Federation Martha Maiden Award
- Scientific career
- Fields: Applied Mathematics; Physics; Computer Science; Semantic web Cognitive Science
- Workplaces: Rensselaer Polytechnic Institute; Woods Hole Oceanographic Institution; National Center for Atmospheric Research; Yale University; Monash University; Chisholm Institute
- Thesis: Compressible Convection in the Sun (With Applications To Granulation, Supergranulation and Sunspots)
- Doctoral advisor: Rene Francois Edouard van der Borght
- Website: tw.rpi.edu/web/person/PeterFox twitter.com/taswegian

Peter Arthur Fox (5 May 1959 – 27 March 2021) was a data science and Semantic eScience researcher at Rensselaer Polytechnic Institute (RPI), United States. He was a Tetherless World Constellation chair and professor of Earth and Environmental Science, Computer Science and Cognitive Science, and director of the Information Technology and Web Science Program at RPI. He was known for defining informatics and data science in earth sciences, bringing Semantic Web research to that community, as well as defining the sun-earth connection research agenda and co-convening the community. Fox was born in Devonport, Tasmania, Australia and resided in Troy, NY, United States until his death on 27 March 2021, at the age of 61.

== Education and early career ==
While studying at Monash University, in Victoria (B.Sc., Mathematics, 1979; B.Sc. (Hons I), Mathematics, 1980; and Ph.D. Applied Mathematics, 1985), Fox worked as a Lecturer in the Mathematics department of Chisholm Institute of Technology (1982–83) and as Assistant Research Scientist in the Mathematics department at Monash University (1983–85).

At the end of December 1985, Fox started his life as a Post Doctoral Fellow (1986–88), and later as an Associate Research Scientist (1988–91) at the Center for Solar and Space Research at Yale University. Fox also taught a course in Astronomy for non-science majors at Yale geared toward students pursuing a liberal arts degree.

While at Yale, Fox was attending a workshop in Boulder, Colorado when he received an invitation to give a talk at the National Center for Atmospheric Research (NCAR). Subsequently, a job offer from NCAR was extended and accepted, where he would remain until 2008.

== Later career and positions ==
From 1991 to 2008, Fox was at the High Altitude Observatory (HAO) of NCAR in Boulder, Colorado, as Scientist until 1995, and Chief Computational Scientist from 1995 to 2008. While at HAO, Fox wrote detailed technical schema that remains decades ahead of its time to this date.

Early in 2008, while employed at HAO, Fox was being actively recruited by a number of academic and research organizations in the U.S.A. and internationally. In September 2008 he accepted a chaired full professor appointment with Rensselaer Polytechnic Institute (RPI) in Troy, New York. Fox was the third senior chair in the Tetherless World Constellation (TWC) joining James Hendler and Deborah McGuinness.

RPI's TWC pursues disciplinary research and education themes centered on the World Wide Web. Peter Fox was the lead professor for the research areas: Data Frameworks, Data Science, Semantic eScience and XInformatics. Since 2009, the team has three applications themes: Open Government Data, Environmental Informatics, and Health Care and Life Science Informatics. Fox's primary appointment was in the Department of Earth and Environmental Sciences in the School of Science. Appointments in the Departments of Computer Science (2008) and Cognitive Science (2014) followed.

In 2012, Fox assumed the directorship of the Information Technology and Web Science (ITWS) academic program to set that program in a very data oriented direction. Around this time, the U.S. Navy was searching for an institution to train select officers in Information Dominance. While originally looking at ivy league universities, the Navy ultimately selected a one-year program that Fox developed.

One of the institutions who actively recruited Fox in 2008, Woods Hole Oceanographic Institution (WHOI), offered him an adjunct appointment in Applied Ocean Physics and Engineering, which remains in place to date. In this role, Fox systematically facilitated the process for WHOI to incorporate Semantic Web and Informatics in research.

Fox was past president of the Federation of Earth Science Information Partners (ESIP), co-founder and past chair of the International Union of Geodesy and Geophysics (IUGG) Union Commission on Data and Information (UCDI) and of the American Geophysical Union (AGU) Special Focus Group on Earth and Space Science Informatics (ESSI). Fox was an associate editor for the Earth Science Informatics journal and a member of the editorial board for Computers & Geosciences. Fox also served on the International Council for Science's Strategic Coordinating Committee for Information and Data and the Research Data Alliance's Technical Advisory Board.

== Honors and awards ==
2021: M. Lee Allison Award for Geoinformatics, Geological Society of America
2018: Fellow, American Association for the Advancement of Science
2015: Fellow, American Geophysical Union
2014: Rensselaer Trustees Award for Academic and Intellectual Achievement
2012: Rensselaer Trustees Award for Academic and Intellectual Achievement
2012: Ian McHarg Medal, European Geosciences Union
2012: Martha Maiden Lifetime Achievement Award, Federation of Earth Science Information Partners (ESIP)
2009: Rensselaer Constellation Chair Medal

== Research and education agenda ==
Fox's research and education agenda covered the fields of data science and analytics, ocean and environmental informatics, computational logic, semantic Web, cognitive bias, semantic data frameworks, and solar and solar-terrestrial physics. The results were applied to large-scale distributed scientific repositories addressing the full life-cycle of data and information within specific science and engineering disciplines as well as among disciplines.

== Books ==
2015: "Semantic eScience" (editor), Springer, Berlin. Special Issue of Earth Science Informatics, ISSN 1865-0473
2015: "The Semantic Web in Earth and Space Science: Current Status and Future Directions" (editor), IOS Press, Amsterdam, the Netherlands. ISBN 978-1-61499-500-5
2015: "Collaborative Knowledge in Scientific Research Networks" (editor), IGI Global, Hershey, Pennsylvania. ISBN 978-1-4666-6567-5
2004: "Solar Variability and its Effect on the Earth’s Atmosphere and Climate System" (editor), AGU Monograph Series 141, American Geophysical Union, Washington D.C. ISBN 978-0-87590-406-1
2000: "Geophysical and Astrophysical Convection" (editor), Gordon and Breach Science Publishers, The Netherlands. ISBN 90-5699-258-9
