= Nigel Shadbolt =

Principal of Jesus College, Oxford

Professor Sir Nigel Shadbolt FRS FREng FBCS
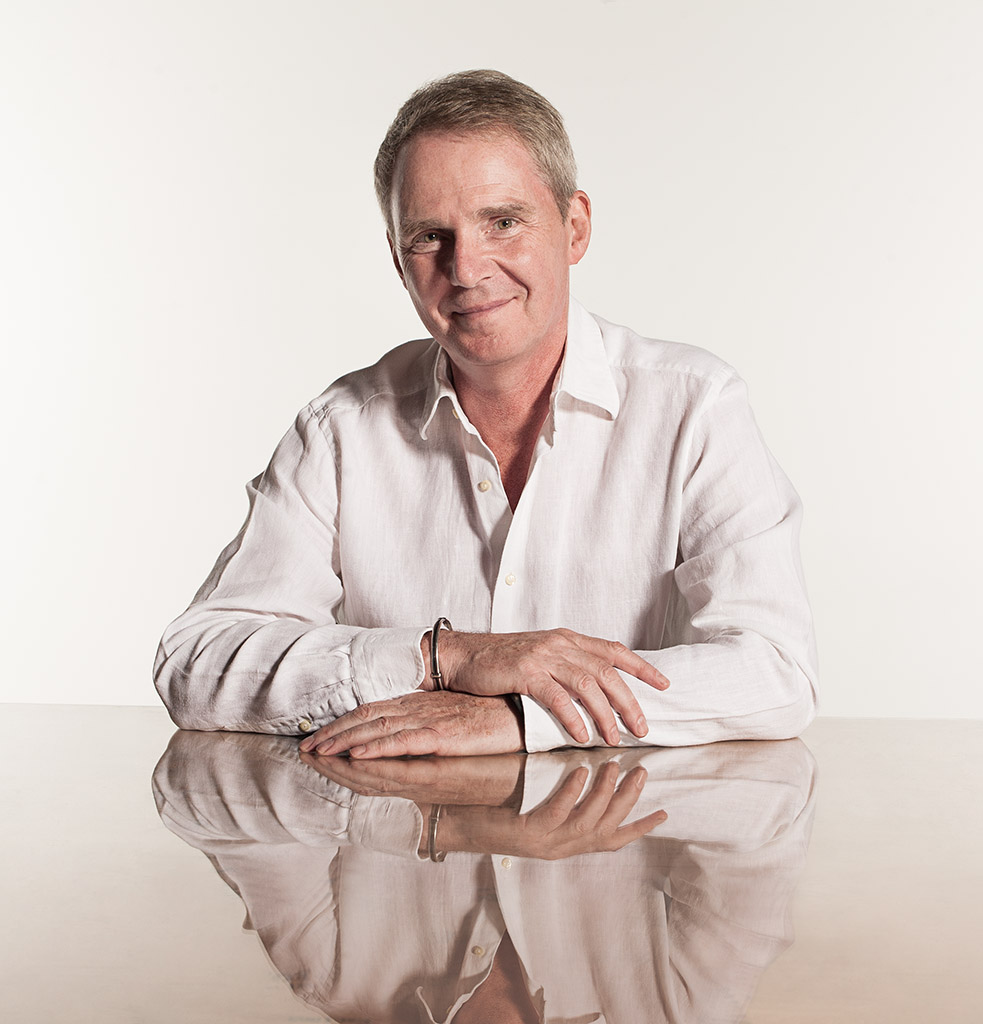
- Shadbolt in June 2013
- Born: Nigel Richard Shadbolt; 9 April 1956 (age 70); London, England
- Education: Lady Manners School
- Alma mater: Newcastle University (BSc); University of Edinburgh (PhD)
- Known for: Artificial Intelligence; Semantic Web; Open Data Institute
- Spouse: Beverly Saunders (m. 1992)
- Awards: Knight Bachelor (2013)
- Scientific career
- Fields: Artificial Intelligence; Web science; Semantic Web; Linked data; Open data
- Workplaces: University of Oxford; Open Data Institute; University of Southampton; University of Nottingham
- Thesis: Constituting Reference in Natural Language: The Problem of Referential Opacity (1986)
- Doctoral advisor: Barry Richards; Henry S. Thompson
- Doctoral students: Jeni Tennison
- Website: www.cs.ox.ac.uk/people/nigel.shadbolt

Sir Nigel Richard Shadbolt (born 9 April 1956) is Principal of Jesus College, Oxford, and Professorial Research Fellow in the Department of Computer Science, University of Oxford. He is chairman of the Open Data Institute which he co-founded with Tim Berners-Lee. He is also a visiting professor in the School of Electronics and Computer Science at the University of Southampton. Shadbolt is an interdisciplinary researcher, policy expert and commentator. His research focuses on understanding how intelligent behaviour is embodied and emerges in humans, machines and, most recently, on the Web, and has made contributions to the fields of psychology, cognitive science, computational neuroscience, artificial intelligence, computer science and the emerging field of web science.

== Education ==
Shadbolt was born in London but adopted and raised in the Derbyshire village of Ashford-in-the-Water, living a "bucolic existence" until he went to university. He went to Lady Manners School, then a state-funded grammar school. He obtained an undergraduate degree in philosophy and psychology from Newcastle University, then received his Ph.D. from the Department of Artificial Intelligence at the University of Edinburgh. His thesis resulted in a framework for understanding how human dialogue is organised and was supervised by Barry Richards and Henry S. Thompson.

== Research and career ==
Shadbolt's research has been in Artificial Intelligence since the late 1970s working on a broad range of topics; from natural language understanding and robotics through to expert systems, computational neuroscience, memory through to the semantic web and linked data. He also writes on the wider implications of his research. One example is the book he co-authored with Kieron O'Hara that examines privacy and trust in the Digital Age – The Spy in the Coffee Machine. His most recent research is on the topic of social machines – understanding the emergent problem solving that arises from a combination of humans, computers and data at web scale. The SOCIAM project on social machines is funded by the Engineering and Physical Sciences Research Council (EPSRC).

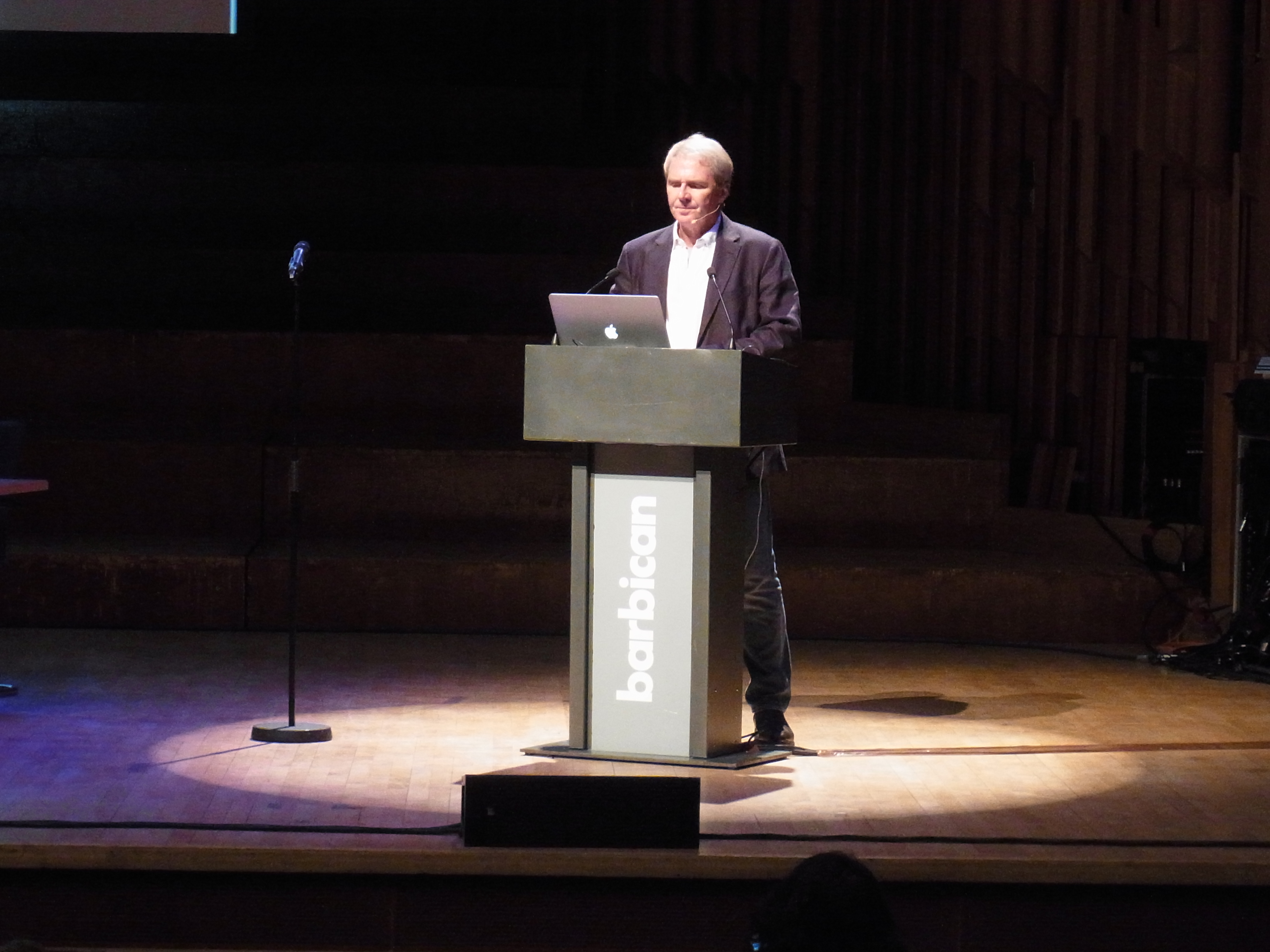
Nigel Shadbolt speaking at Wikimania 2014

In 1983, Shadbolt moved to the University of Nottingham and joined the Department of Psychology. From 2000 to 2015 he was professor of artificial intelligence in the School of Electronics and Computer Science at the University of Southampton.

From 2000 to 2007, he led and directed the Advanced Knowledge Technologies (AKT) Interdisciplinary Research Collaboration (IRC). It produced a broad range of Semantic Web research, including how diverse information could be harvested and integrated and how semantics could help computers systems recommend content.

In 2006 Shadbolt was elected a fellow of the Royal Academy of Engineering (FREng). He is a Fellow of the British Computer Society (FBCS) and was its president in its 50th jubilee year. That same year, Nigel Shadbolt, Tim Berners-Lee, Wendy Hall and Daniel Weitzner, founded the Web Science Research Initiative, to promote the discipline of web science and foster research collaboration between the University of Southampton and Massachusetts Institute of Technology.

From 2007 to 2011 Shadbolt was deputy head of the School of Electronics and Computer Science (ECS) at the University of Southampton, from 2011 to 2014 he was head of the Web and Internet Science Group, the first research group dedicated to the study of Web science and Internet science, within ECS, comprising 140 staff, researchers and PhD students.

His Semantic Web research led to the formation of Garlik, offering identity protection services. In 2008, Garlik was awarded Technology Pioneer status by the Davos World Economic Forum and won the UK BT Flagship IT Award. Experian acquired Garlik in November 2011.

In June 2009 he was appointed together with Tim Berners-Lee as Information Advisor to the UK Government. The two led a team to develop data.gov.uk, a single point of access for UK non-personal Governmental public data. In May 2010 he was appointed by the UK Coalition Government to the Public Sector Transparency Board responsible for setting open data standards across the public sector and developing the legal Right to Data.

In December 2012, Shadbolt and Tim Berners-Lee formally launched the Open Data Institute. The ODI focuses on incubating and nurturing new businesses wanting to harness open data, training and promoting standards. In 2013, Shadbolt and Tim Berners-Lee joined the board of advisors of tech startup State.com, creating a network of structured opinions on the semantic web. On 1 August 2015 he was appointed principal of Jesus College, Oxford and a professorial research fellow in the Department of Computer Science, University of Oxford. He is also a Pro-vice-chancellor without portfolio at the University of Oxford. He will step down from his role at Jesus College in July 2026 upon reaching the age of 70.

=== Appointments ===
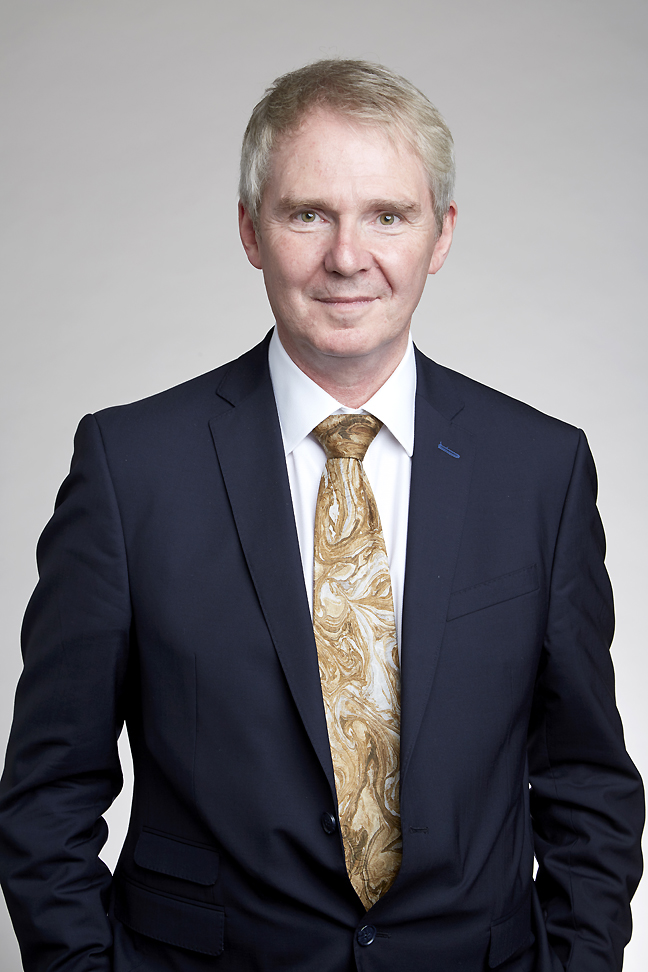
Nigel Shadbolt at the Royal Society admissions day in London, July 2017

- 2008–present: Director, Web Science Trust
- 2010–2015: Chair of Local Public Data Panel, Department of Communities and Local Government.
- 2011–2014: Chair of UK Midata programme, BIS, appointed by the Minister of State. The Midata programme was an element of the consumer empowerment strategy put in place by the 2010-2015 coalition government.
- 2012–2016: UK Health Sector Transparency Board, DHS.
- 2013–2015: UK Research Sector Transparency Board, appointed by Minister of State
- 2013–2015: UK Information Economy Council, BIS, appointed by Minister of State
- 2015–2016: Chair, Shadbolt Review of Computer Science Employability
- 2015–2016: UK French Data Task Force, appointed by Chancellor of Exchequer
- 2015–present: Member, HMG Digital Advisory Board. Appointed by Minister of State
- 2025: Chair of AI@Oxford Research

=== Awards and honours ===
- 2003: Won the 2003 International Semantic Web Challenge
- 2004: IEEE Computer Society Meritorious Service Award
- 2004: IEEE Computer Society Golden Core Award
- 2009: Robert Fulton SEIKM Best Paper Award
- 2010: Demographics User Group Award with Tim Berners-Lee
- 2011: Oxford Internet Institute OII Internet and Society Award
- 2011: DSc Honoris Causa, University of Nottingham
- 2013: Knighted in the 2013 Birthday Honours for services to science and engineering
- 2014: Appointed EPSRC RISE (Recognising Inspirational Scientists and Engineers) Fellow
- 2016: Elected first Jisc Fellow
- 2017: Elected Fellow of the Royal Society (FRS)

Shadbolt was interviewed by Jim Al-Khalili on The Life Scientific on BBC Radio 4 in April 2015. In 2016, he delivered the Hinton Lecture of the Royal Academy of Engineering, entitled "Engineering the Future of Data".

== Personal life ==
Shadbolt is married to Bev Saunders, a designer, and has two children.
