= Allemang =

Allemang is a surname. Notable people with the surname include:

- Dean Allemang, American computer scientist
- Drew Allemang, assistant general manager and director of Canadian scouting for the Hamilton Tiger-Cats of the Canadian Football League
- Margaret Allemang (1914–2005), Canadian nurse and academic
- Marv Allemang (born 1953), Canadian football player
- Jon Allemang (born 1982), American Honors Chemistry Educator, Westside High School, Omaha, NE
