= James Hendler =

American computer scientist (born 1957)

James Alexander Hendler
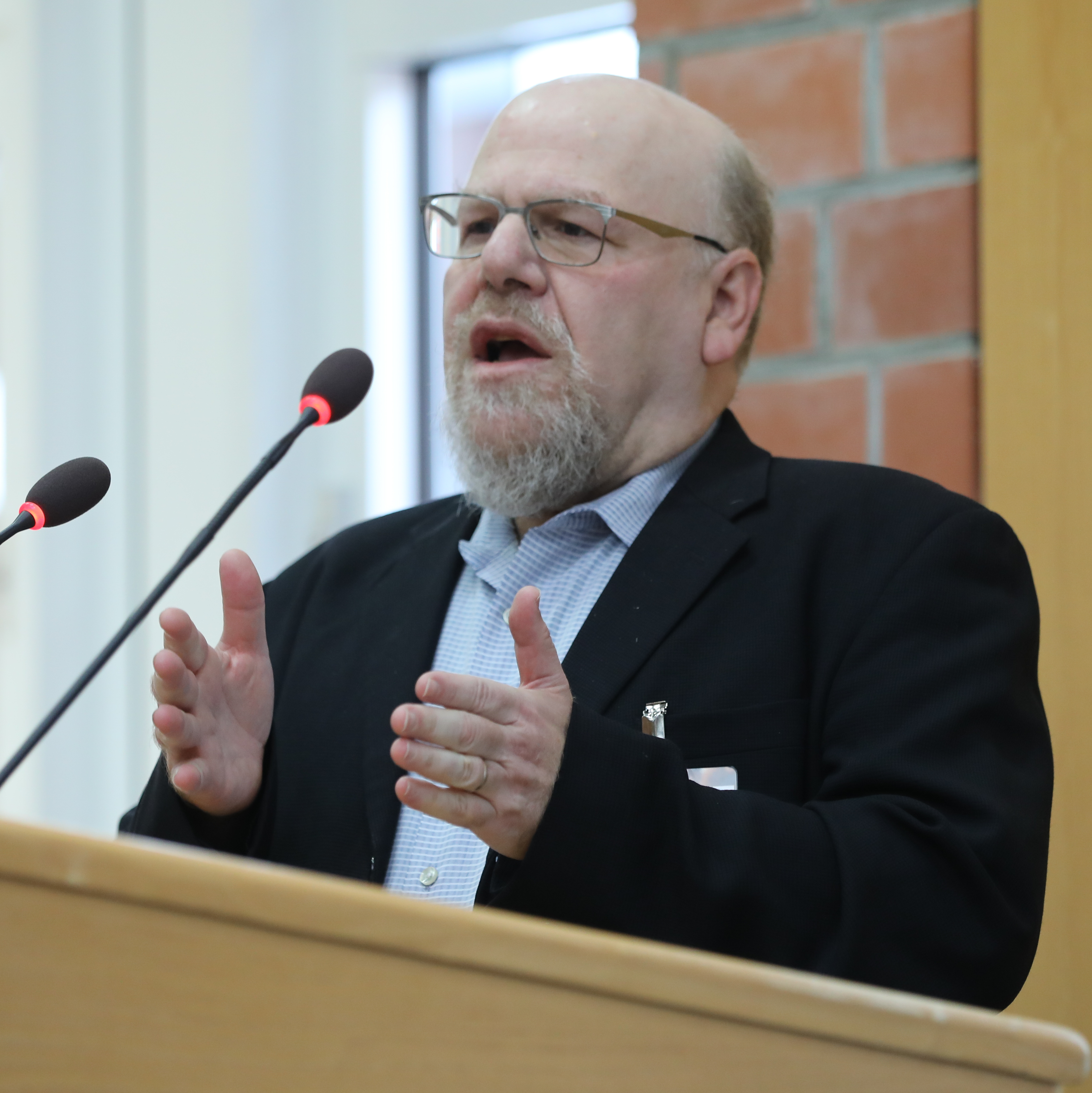
- Born: 2 April 1957 (age 69); Queens, New York
- Citizenship: United States
- Education: Yale University; Southern Methodist University; Brown University
- Known for: Significant Contributions to the Semantic Web
- Spouse: Terry Horowit
- Children: Sharon Horowit-Hendler (1987)
- Scientific career
- Fields: Artificial intelligence Semantic Web
- Workplaces: Rensselaer Polytechnic Institute University of Maryland
- Thesis: Integrating Marker-Passing and Problem-Solving: A Spreading-Activation Approach to Improved Choice in Planning (1986)
- Doctoral advisor: Eugene Charniak
- Doctoral students: Jen Golbeck
- Website: www.cs.rpi.edu/~hendler twitter.com/jahendler

James Alexander Hendler (born April 2, 1957) is an artificial intelligence researcher at Rensselaer Polytechnic Institute, United States, and one of the originators of the Semantic Web. He is a Fellow of the National Academy of Public Administration.

== Education ==
Hendler completed his Doctor of Philosophy degree at Brown University (1986) with a thesis on automated planning and scheduling. He also has an MSc (1983) from Brown University, an MS (1981) in Cognitive Psychology from Southern Methodist University, and a BS (1978) from Yale University.

== Research ==
Hendler's research interests are in the semantic web and artificial intelligence. Hendler held a longstanding position as professor at the University of Maryland where he was the Director of the Joint Institute for Knowledge Discovery and held joint appointments in the Department of Computer Science, the Institute for Advanced Computer Studies and the Institute for Systems Research. Hendler was the Director for Semantic Web and Agent Technology at the Maryland Information and Network Dynamics Laboratory. He is a Fellow of the American Association for Artificial Intelligence, the British Computer Society, the Institute of Electrical and Electronics Engineers, the AAAS and the Association for Computing Machinery and the National Academy of Public Administration (United States).

Hendler was co-author, with Tim Berners-Lee and Ora Lassila, of the article "The Semantic Web" which appeared in Scientific American in 2001.

On June 14, 2006, James A. Hendler was appointed senior constellation professor of the Tetherless World Constellation at Rensselaer Polytechnic Institute, and he became a professor at that institute starting on January 1, 2007. Hendler has appointments in Computer, Web and Cognitive Sciences, and served as the Dean for Information Technology and Web Science from 2009 to 2012. In 2012 he became the Head of the Computer Science Department at RPI and in 2013 he became the Director of the RPI Institute for Data Exploration and Applications. In 2017, he also became the Rensselaer lead of the joint RPI-IBM Center for Health Empowerment by Analytics, Learning and Semantics, (HEALS) a member of the IBM Artificial Intelligence Horizons Network. In 2019, Hendler was named Director of the RPI-IBM Artificial Intelligence Research Collaboration, a large joint project between IBM Research and Rensselaer Polytechnic Institute. In 2022, Hendler became the Founding Director of Rensselaer's Future of Computing Institute. In 2025 he became the head of the cognitive science department at RPI.

Hendler helps lead the Tetherless World Constellation on increasing access to information at any time and place without the need for a "tether" to a specific computer or device. Researchers envision an increasingly web-accessible world in which personal digital assistants (PDAs), cameras, music-listening devices, cell phones, smartphones, laptops, and other technologies converge to offer the user interactive information and communication. Hendler is the former chair of the board of directors of the Web Science Trust and has been a visiting professor at Hebrew University, DeMontfort University, Bath Spa University, University of Edinburgh and an honorary professor at Wuhan University and University of Leicester.

He is also the Editor in Chief Emeritus of IEEE Intelligent Systems and was the first computer scientist to serve on the Board of Reviewing Editors for Science.

He is a former member of the US Air Force Science Advisory Board and a former Chief Scientist of the Information Systems Office at the US Defense Advanced Research Projects Agency (DARPA). During his tenure there, he was responsible for projects such as the Control of Agent Based Systems (CoABS) program which led to the creation of other Agent-based projects: Taskable Agent Software Kit (TASK) and DARPA's Agent Markup Language (DAML) - the latter of which was involved in funding the emerging Semantic Web area.

Hendler served as an "Internet Web Expert" for the U.S. government, providing guidance to the Data.gov project, and in September 2013 he was appointed as the Open Data Advisor for NY State. In 2015, he was appointed a member of the US Homeland Security Science and Technology Advisory Committee (HSSTAC) and in 2016 appointed to the National Academies Board on Research Data and Information. In 2017, he became a member of the Director's Advisory Committee for the National Security Directorate at PNNL. In 2018, he was appointed chair of the Association for Computing Machinery's US Technology Policy Committee (USTPC, formerly USACM) and in 2021 became chair of the ACM's Global Technology Policy Council.

In 2018, Hendler was elected as a Fellow of the National Academy of Public Administration (United States).

Since 2018, Hendler has been a regular participant on the Roundtable Panel at WAMC radio and in 2021 he became a member of the Board of Trustees of WAMC.

== Books ==
- Linking the World’s Information: Essays on Tim Berners-Lee’s Invention of the World Wide Web, O. Seneviratne, J. Hendler (eds), ACM Press, 2023.
- Social Machines: The coming collision of artificial intelligence, social networking and humanity w/Alice Mulvehill, (2016) Apress ISBN 978-1-4842-1157-1.
- Web Science:Understanding the Emergence of Macro-Level Features on the World Wide Web w/Kieron O'Hara, Noshir Contractor, Wendy Hall, Nigel Shadbolt; NOW publishers, 2013 - doi:10.1561/1800000017.
- Semantic Web for the Working Ontologist (w/ Dean Allemang, Fabien Gandon) Morgan Kaufmann (2008) ISBN 1450376142 (second edition, 2011)(third edition, 2020).
- Spinning the Semantic Web (ed) MIT Press (2005) ISBN 0-262-56212-X
- Robots for Kids (ed) Morgan Kaufmann (2000) ISBN 1-55860-597-5
- Massively Parallel Artificial Intelligence (ed) AAAI Press (1994) ISBN 0-262-61102-3
- Expert Systems: The User Interface (ed) Ablex Pub (1988) ISBN 0-89391-429-0
- Integrating Marker-Passing and Problem Solving. Lawrence Erlbaum (1987) ISBN 0-89859-982-2

== Honors ==
This short work is the first draft of a book manuscript by Aaron Swartz written for the series "Synthesis Lectures on the Semantic Web" at the invitation James Hendler. Unfortunately, the book wasn't completed before Aaron's death in January 2013. As a tribute, the editor and publisher are publishing the work digitally without cost.

- 1995 - Fulbright Foundation Fellowship
- 1999 - Fellow, AAAI
- 2002 - Department of the Air Force Decoration for Exceptional Civilian Service
- 2005 - Robert Engelmore Memorial Lecture Prize, AAAI
- 2007 - Fellow, British Computer Society
- 2009 - Fellow, IEEE
- 2009 - Fellow, Semantic Technology Institute International
- 2010 - Named to the "Honor Roll" of 20 most innovative US professors by Playboy magazine
- 2010 - Named "Internet Web Expert" for US Office of Science and Technology Policy
- 2012 - Fellow, American Association for the Advancement of Science
- 2013 - Named Open Data Advisor, New York State Government
- 2014 - IBM Faculty Research Award
- 2015 - Appointed Member of the US Homeland Security Science and Technology Advisory Committee
- 2016 - Appointed Member of the National Academies' Board on Research Data and Information.
- 2016 - Fellow, Association for Computing Machinery
- 2017 - Distinguished Service Award, AAAI
- 2018 - Fellow, National Academy of Public Administration (United States)
- 2021 - chair, Global Technology Policy Council, Association for Computing Machinery
- 2022 - Honorary Professor and Fellow, University of Leicester
- 2023 - Service Award, Semantic Web Science Association
- 2024 - Steering Committee, AI Alliance.
- 2025 - Recipient of 2025 AAAI "Edward Feigenbaum Prize".
- 2026 - Recipient (with Tim Berners-Lee and Ora Lassila) of Lifetime Achievement award at Knowledge Graph Conference)

=== Boards and advisory boards ===
- WAMC Public Radio, Board of Trustees.
- Trinity Alliance (NGO), Board of Trustees.
- Timbr.AI, Advisory Board
- Web Science Trust, board member, former chair of the Board
- Radar Networks, Advisory Board, (sold to EVRI)
- TopQuadrant, Advisory Board
- Franz Inc, Advisory Board
- Bright Hub, Advisory Board
- SocialWire, Advisory Board
- Common Crawl, Advisory Board
