= HWS =

HWS may refer to:

- Hatif Welfare Society
- Hawkstowe railway station, Melbourne
- Hay–Wells syndrome
- Health web science
- Hobart and William Smith Colleges
- Hollywood (programming language)
- Hong Wen School, in Singapore
- Hypersonic Weapon System
- Holographic Weapon Sight
