= Wendy Hall =

British computer scientist (born 1952)

Professor Dame Wendy Hall DBE FRS FREng MAE FIET
- Hall in 2026
- Born: Wendy Hall; 25 October 1952 (age 74); London, England, UK
- Education: Ealing Grammar School for Girls
- Alma mater: University of Southampton (BSc, PhD); City University London (MSc)
- Known for: Web science
- Spouse: Peter E. Chandler (m. 1980)
- Awards: Suffrage Science award (2016)
- Scientific career
- Fields: Web Science; Web Technologies; Semantic Web; Digital Libraries; Hypermedia; Multimedia
- Workplaces: Multicosm Ltd.; University of Southampton; Oxford Polytechnic; University of Michigan
- Thesis: Automorphisms and coverings of Klein surfaces (1977)
- Doctoral advisor: David Singerman
- Wendy Hall's voice from the BBC programme The Life Scientific, 8 October 2013
- Website: users.ecs.soton.ac.uk/wh

Dame Wendy Hall (born 25 October 1952) is a British computer scientist. She is Regius Professor of Computer Science at the University of Southampton.

== Early life and education ==
Wendy Hall was born in west London and educated at Ealing Grammar School for Girls. She studied for undergraduate and postgraduate degrees in mathematics at the University of Southampton. She completed her Bachelor of Science (BSc) degree in 1974, and her Doctor of Philosophy (PhD) degree in 1977. Her doctoral thesis was titled Automorphisms and coverings of Klein surfaces. She later completed a Master of Science degree in Computing at City University London.

== Career ==
Hall returned to the University of Southampton in 1984 to join the newly formed computer science group there, working in multimedia and hypermedia. Her team invented the Microcosm hypermedia system (before the World Wide Web existed), which was commercialised as a start-up company, Multicosm Ltd.

Wendy Hall and Hugh Davis led the Multimedia Research Group at the University of Southampton, which created commercial systems near the beginning of the hypertext and database system era, including:

- Microcosm 1994 (which used link services)
- Distributed Link Services 1995
- Multicosm 1998
- Portal Maximizer 2001

These systems used a separate server to hold a linkbase and recorded links from anchor points within a Word or pdf document, similar to Vannevar Bush’s original vision of hypertext documents. This linkbase could then be updated and maintained as a separate database to create a separate, flexible overlay for any document.

Hall was appointed the university's first female professor of engineering in 1994. She then served as Head of the School of Electronics and Computer Science from 2002 to 2007.

In 2006, along with Tim Berners-Lee, Nigel Shadbolt and Daniel Weitzner, Hall became a founding director of the Web Science Research Initiative (WSRI). Now known as the Web Science Trust, the WSRI was originally a collaboration between the University of Southampton (ECS) and MIT (CSAIL) which aimed to coordinate and support the study of the World Wide Web. The WSRI's activities helped to formally establish the concept of Web Science, and Hall is now executive director of the Web Science Trust.

Hall was President of the British Computer Society from 2003 to 2004 and of the Association for Computing Machinery from 2008 to 2010. Since 2014, she has served as a Commissioner for the Global Commission on Internet Governance.

In 2017, Hall was appointed Regius Professor of Computer Science at the University of Southampton.

In 2020, she was appointed as Chair of the Ada Lovelace Institute by the Nuffield Foundation – the organisation's independent funder, succeeding Alan Wilson.

Since 2022, Hall has been the Editor-in-Chief of Royal Society Open Science and served as the Chair of the Royal Society Publishing Board from 2017 to 2022.

=== Awards and honours ===
Hall was appointed Commander of the Order of the British Empire (CBE) in the 2000 Birthday Honours. She was promoted to Dame Commander of the Order of the British Empire (DBE) in the 2009 New Year Honours.

Hall also has honorary degrees from Oxford Brookes University, Glamorgan University, Cardiff University, Open University of Catalonia and the University of Pretoria.

In 2000, she was elected a Fellow of the Royal Academy of Engineering (FREng) and is a member of the Academy of Europe. She is a Fellow of the British Computer Society (FBCS) (also serving as president) and a Fellow of the Institution of Engineering and Technology (FIET). In 2002, she was appointed a Fellow of the City and Guilds (FCGI). Hall was elected a Fellow of the Royal Society (FRS) in 2009.

Her nomination for the Royal Society reads:

Distinguished for her contribution to understanding the interactions of humans with large scale multimedia information systems. Her early ideas which developed in parallel with development of the world wide web, www, are now forming key elements of subsequent development into the Semantic Web. Her most recent work focuses on the development of a new field of Web Science focused on understanding and exploring the various influences, science, commerce, public, politics which drive the evolution of the www. Her research is aimed at both understanding the evolution of the web and engineering its future.

In 2006, she was the winner of the ABIE Award for Technical Leadership from the Anita Borg Institute.

In 2010, she was named a Fellow of the ACM "for contributions to the semantic web and web science and for service to ACM and the international computing community." In 2016, she was named a Kluge Chair in Technology and society at the Library of Congress. She is a member of the Advisory Council for the Campaign for Science and Engineering, and a member of the Academia Europaea.

She was one of the 30 women identified in the BCS Women in IT Campaign in 2014 and was featured in the e-book of these 30 women in IT, "Women in IT: Inspiring the next generation" produced by the BCS, The Chartered Institute for IT, as a free download e-book, from various sources.

In February 2013, she was assessed as one of the 100 most powerful women in the United Kingdom by Woman's Hour on BBC Radio 4. In her Desert Island Discs in 2014, on the same radio channel, she chose Wikipedia as the book she would most like if abandoned on a desert island. She won the Suffrage Science award in 2016.

== Publications ==
In addition to over 500 peer-reviewed journal articles, Hall co-authored Four Internets with Kieron O'Hara and Vint Cerf in 2021.

== Personal life ==
Hall is married to Peter Chandler, a plasma physicist.
