= WSRI =

WSRI may refer to:

- WSRI (FM), a radio station (88.7 FM) licensed to Sugar Grove, Illinois, United States
- Web Science Research Initiative
