= Tetherless World Constellation =

Research institution at Rensselaer Polytechnic Institute

- Rensselaer Polytechnic Institute
- Type: Private
- Established: 2008
- Chair: James Hendler; Deborah McGuinness; Peter Fox
- Location: Troy, NY, USA
- Website: http://tw.rpi.edu

The Tetherless World Constellation (TWC) is a multidisciplinary research institution at Rensselaer Polytechnic Institute (RPI).

== Research interests ==
The institution focuses on the study of theories, methods and applications of the World Wide Web. Research is carried out in three inter-connected themes: Future Web, Semantic Foundations and Xinformatics.

== Faculty and structure ==
At Rensselaer, a constellation is a multidisciplinary team composed of senior and junior faculty members, research scientists, and postdoc, graduate, and undergraduate students. The faculty of each constellation includes three or more outstanding stars in a particular research field. The three professors at TWC are James Hendler, Deborah McGuinness and Peter Fox.

The Tetherless World Constellation is one of the founding members of the Web Science Trust network of research laboratories.

Previous faculty working with the TWC include NLP researcher Heng Ji.
