= Internet science =

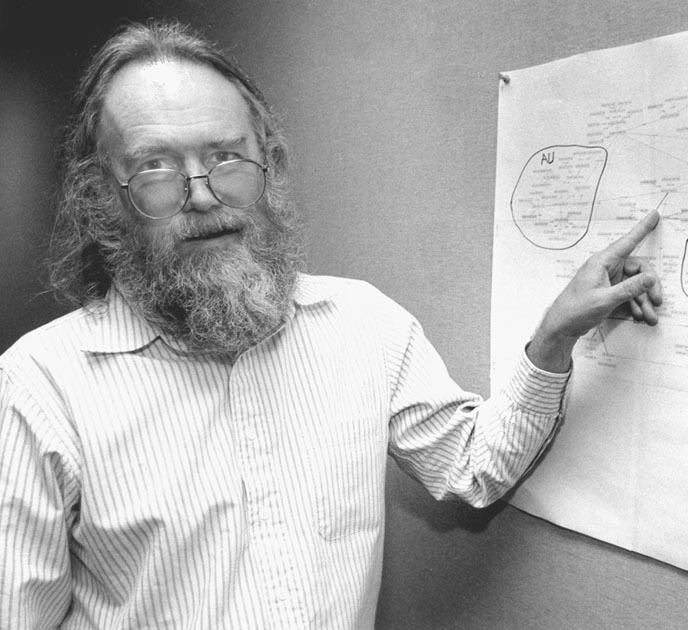
Jon Postel at work in 1994

Internet science is an interdisciplinary science that examines all aspects of the co-evolution in Internet networks and society. It works in the intersection of and in the gaps among a wide range of disciplines that have had to respond to the impact of the Internet on their 'home turf' and/or offer specific conceptual or methodological contributions. These include many natural sciences (e.g., complexity science, computer science, engineering, life sciences, mathematics, physics, psychology, statistics, systems and evolutionary biology), social sciences (e.g. anthropology, economics, philosophy, sociology, and political science), humanities (e.g., art, history, linguistics, literature and history) and some existing interdisciplines that cross traditional Faculty boundaries (e.g., technology, medicine, law). Professor Noshir Contractor and others have located it at the intersection of computational social science, network science, network engineering and Web science. By understanding the role of society in shaping Internet networks and being shaped by them Internet science aims to take care of the Internet in a way similar to that in which Web science aims to take care of the Web. The lingua franca in this interdisciplinary area include Internet standards and associated implementation, social processes, Internet infrastructure and policy.

Many disciplines support Internet science with different analysis tools, designs, and languages. To have a productive and effective dialogue between disciplines requires incentives for cooperation. The three main elements of Internet science are: multidisciplinary convergence, observability and constructive experimentation.

The European Commission funded a Network of Excellence on Internet Science (project acronym EINS) over the period December 2011-May 2015 under the FP7 funding programme. The Network in May 2015 had 48 member universities and research organisations and 180 individual affiliate researchers. Two major international Internet science conferences were held in April 2013 and May 2015 together with an unconference at the University of Bologna in May 2014 and official workshops at international academic conferences such as Human Behavior and the Evolution of Society and international inter-governmental and multistakeholder conferences such as the 2013 United Nations Internet Governance Forum.

== Research ==
Significant areas of current Internet science research include:

=== Net neutrality ===
Net neutrality is the rule where Internet service providers should treat all the traffic on their networks equally. This means that companies should not slow down access or block any website content on the Web. In the United States, high-speed Internet service providers (ISPs), including AT&T, Comcast, Time Warner and Verizon, have sought support for a two-tiered Internet service model.

In 2014, President Obama announced a new plan to preserve "net neutrality" and to prevent Internet service providers from blocking or slowing websites or creating different tiers of speed. He said-, "No service should be stuck in a ‘slow lane’ because it does not pay a fee," he wrote in a statement. "That kind of gatekeeping would undermine the level playing field essential to the Internet’s growth."

=== Internet privacy ===
Internet privacy (online privacy) is an opportunity of individuals to regulate the flow of information and have access to data, which is generated during a browsing session.

=== Internet security ===
Internet security includes things like phishing, spyware and malware.

=== Sustainability ===
Google has signed two contracts with wind developers to power its data center in Finland with 100% renewable energy. Facebook decided to build a data center in Iowa, and has helped drive the local energy provider to scrap plans to build a nuclear power plant, and instead build a $2bn(£1.23bn) wind farm, which has led to the biggest single order of wind turbines on record.

=== Internet as a socio-technical critical infrastructure ===
Infrastructure provides a large range of vital services—such as the ability to move goods, people, and information. Infrastructural services like gas, electricity, water, transport, and banking are highly interconnected and mutually dependent in various complex ways. They are linked physically, and through important ICT systems, to prevent breakdowns from escalating into whole infrastructure failure.

There is ongoing activity on the development of Internet Science curricula, initially on a postgraduate level.

== Evolution of Internet science ==
1934: The first person who imagined a 'Radiated Library' in 1934 was Paul Otlet.

1965: Two different computers started to communicate at MIT Lincoln Lab.

1968: Beranek and Newman have discovered an effectiveness and final version of the Interface Message Processor (IMP) specifications.

1969: The NPL network send its first packets. The first four nodes of the ARPANET were installed by UCLA's Network Measurement Centre, Stanford Research Institute (SRI), University of California-Santa Barbara and University of Utah.

1972: Ray Tomlinson introduces a network e-mail system. The International Network Working Group (INWG) forms to research and develop standard protocols.

1973: The term 'Internet' was born. Also a global networking becomes a reality as the University College of London (England) and Royal Radar Establishment (Norway), which connects to ARPANET.

1974: The first Internet Service Provider (ISP) was born with the introduction of a commercial version of ARPANET. This is also known as a 'Telenet'.

1974: Vinton Cerf and Bob Kahn have published "A Protocol for Packet Network Interconnection," which details the design of TCP.

1976: Queen Elizabeth II sends her first e-mail.

1979: USENET forms to host news and discussion groups.

1981: The National Science Foundation (NSF) provided a grant to demonstrate the Computer Science Network (CSNET) and afterwards to provide networking services to university computer scientists.

1982: Transmission Control Protocol (TCP) and Internet Protocol (IP) arise the protocol for ARPANET.

1983: The Domain Name System (DNS) established the familiar .edu, .gov, .com, .mil, .org, .net, and .int system to name websites.

1984: William Gibson was the first person who used the term "cyberspace."

1985: Symbolics.com, the website for Symbolics Computer Corp. in Massachusetts, was the first registered domain.

1986: The National Science Foundation's NSFNET goes online to connected supercomputer centers at 56,000 bits per second — the speed of a typical dial-up computer modem.

1987: The number of hosts on the Internet exceeds 20,000. Cisco ships its first router.

1989: World.std.com becomes the first commercial provider of dial-up access to the Internet.

1990: Tim Berners-Lee develops HyperText Markup Language (HTML). This technology continues to have a large impact on ways how humans view and navigate the Internet in present days.

1991: CERN introduces the World Wide Web to the public.

1992: The first audio and video were distributed over the Internet. The phrase "surfing the Internet" was very popular.

1993: The number of websites reached 600 and the White House and United Nations go online.

1994: Netscape Communications was born. Microsoft created a Web browser for Windows 95.

1995: Compuserve, America Online and Prodigy began to provide Internet access.

1996: The browser war, primarily between the two major players Microsoft and Netscape, heated up.

1997: PC makers removed or hid Microsoft's Internet software on new versions of Windows 95.

1998: The Google search engine was born and changed the way users engage with the Internet.

1999: The Netscape has been bought by AOL.

2000: The dot-com bubble bursted.

2001: A federal judge shouted down Napster.

2003. The SQL Slammer worm has spread worldwide in just 10 minutes.

2004: Facebook went online and the era of social networking began.

2005: YouTube.com has been launched.

2006: AOL changed its business model and offered the most services for free and relied on advertising to generate revenue.

2009: 40th anniversary of the Internet.

2010: 400 million active users have been reached in Facebook.

2011: Twitter and Facebook played a large role in the Middle East revolts.
