= Salvatore J. Stolfo =

American computer scientist

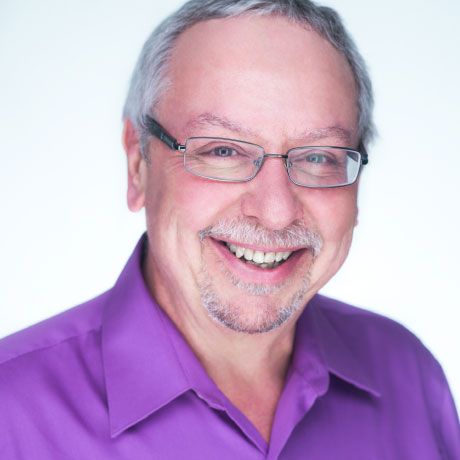
- Born: Brooklyn, New York, United States
- Education: Brooklyn College (B.Sc.), NYU Courant Institute (Ph.D.)
- Awards: IEEE Fellow (2018), ACM Fellow (2019)
- Scientific career
- Workplaces: Columbia University

Salvatore J. Stolfo is an academic and professor of computer science at Columbia University, specializing in computer security.

== Early life ==
Born in Brooklyn, New York, Stolfo received a Bachelor of Science degree in Computer Science and Mathematics from Brooklyn College in 1974. He received his Ph.D. from NYU Courant Institute in 1979 and has been on the faculty of Columbia ever since, where he's taught courses in Artificial Intelligence, Intrusion and Anomaly Detection Systems, Introduction to Programming, Fundamental Algorithms, Data Structures, and Knowledge-Based Expert Systems.

== Academic research ==
While at Columbia, Stolfo has received close to $50M in funding for research that has broadly focused on Security, Intrusion Detection, Anomaly Detection, Machine Learning and includes early work in parallel computing and artificial intelligence. He has published or co-authored over 250 papers and has over 46,000 citations with an H-index of 102. In 1996 he proposed a project with DARPA that applies machine learning to behavioral patterns to detect fraud or intrusion in networks.

DADO, developed by in part by Stolfo, introduced the parallel computing primitive: “Broadcast, Resolve, Report”, a hardwire implemented mechanism that today is called MapReduce.

Among his earliest work, Stolfo along with colleague Greg Vesonder of Bell Labs, developed a large-scale expert data analysis system, called ACE (Automated Cable Expertise) for the nation's phone system. AT&T Bell Labs distributed ACE to a number of telephone wire centers to improve the management and scheduling of repairs in the local loop.

Stolfo coined the term FOG computing (not to be confused with fog computing) where technology is used “to launch disinformation attacks against malicious insiders, preventing them from distinguishing the real sensitive customer data from fake worthless data.”

In 2005 Stolfo received funding from the Army Research Office to conduct a workshop to bring together a group of researchers to help identify a research program to focus on insider threats.

He was elevated to IEEE Fellow in 2018 "for his contributions to machine learning based cybersecurity."

He was elected as an ACM Fellow in 2019 "for contributions to machine-learning-based cybersecurity and parallel hardware for database inference systems".

== Career ==
Founded in 2011, Red Balloon Security (or RBS) is a cyber security company founded by Dr Sal Stolfo and Dr Ang Cui. A spinout from the IDS lab, RBS developed a symbiote technology called FRAK as a host defense for embedded systems under the sponsorship of DARPA's Cyber Fast Track program.

Created based on their IDS lab research for the DARPA Active Authentication and the Anomaly Detection at Multiple Scales program, Dr Sal Stolfo and Dr. Angelos Keromytis founded Allure Security Technologies. Using active behavioral authentication and decoy technology Stolfo pioneered and patented in 1996.

Founded in 2009, Allure Security Technology was created based on work done under DARPA sponsorship in Columbia's IDS lab based on DARPA prompts to research how to detect hackers once they are inside an organization's perimeter and how to continuously authenticate a user without a password.

Stolfo's company Electronic Digital Documents produced a “DataBlade” technology, which Informix marketed during their strategy of acquisition and development in the mid 80's. Stolfo's patented merge/purge technology called EDD DataCleanser DataBlade was licensed by Informix. Since its acquisition by IBM in 2005, IBM Informix is one of the world's most widely used database servers, with users ranging from the world's largest corporations to startups.

System Detection was one of the companies founded by Prof. Stolfo to commercialize the Anomaly Detection technology developed in the IDS lab. The company ultimately reorganized and was rebranded as Trusted Computer Solutions. That company was recently acquired by Raytheon.

Recently a jury awarded Columbia University $185 million for patent infringement for one of Prof. Stolfo's inventions, the Application Communities technology. https://news.columbia.edu/news/columbia-university-awarded-185-million-patent-infringement-nortonlifelock-inc. The final order from the judge applied nearly treble damages: https://www.reuters.com/legal/litigation/gen-digital-owes-columbia-481-mln-us-patent-fight-judge-says-2023-10-02/
