= Deborah McGuinness =

American computer scientist

Deborah L. McGuinness
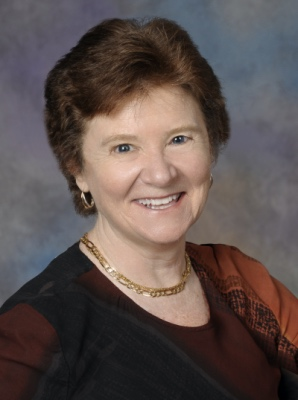
- Born: Deborah Louise McGuinness; 1960 (age 65–66)
- Education: Duke University (BS); University of California at Berkeley (MS); Rutgers University (PhD)
- Awards: Fellow of the American Association for the Advancement of Science (2014)
- Scientific career
- Fields: Semantic Web; Ontologies; Artificial Intelligence; Data Science; Health Informatics
- Workplaces: Rensselaer Polytechnic Institute; Stanford University
- Thesis: Explaining reasoning in description logics (1996)
- Doctoral advisor: Alexander Tiberiu Borgida
- Website: https://www.cs.rpi.edu/~dlm/

Deborah Louise McGuinness (born ca. 1960) is an American computer scientist and researcher at Rensselaer Polytechnic Institute (RPI). She is a professor of Computer, Cognitive and Web Sciences, Industrial and Systems Engineering, and an endowed chair in the Tetherless World Constellation, a multidisciplinary research institution within RPI that focuses on the study of theories, methods and applications of the World Wide Web. Her fields of expertise include interdisciplinary data integration, artificial intelligence, specifically in knowledge representation and reasoning, description logics, the semantic web, explanation, and trust.

== Education ==
McGuinness completed her Ph.D. in computer science from Rutgers University in 1997 with a thesis titled “Explaining Reasoning in Description Logics”. She received a master's degree in computer science from the University of California, Berkeley (1981) and a Bachelor of Science in computer science and Bachelor of Arts (BA) in mathematics from Duke University (1980).

== Career ==
McGuinness’ career began in 1980 as a technical staff member for AT&T Bell Labs where for eighteen years, she worked in Artificial Intelligence applied and fundamental research, with business rotations in Home Information Systems, Home Communication Systems and managed an emerging technologies and applications group for AT&T's personal online services.

From 1998 to 2007, McGuinness served as co-director and senior research scientist and later acting director in the Knowledge Systems Laboratory (KSL), Artificial Intelligence Laboratory at Stanford University.

In October 2007, she joined the faculty at RPI and became an endowed constellation chair with James Hendler, within the Tetherless World Constellation. While at RPI, she became the founding director of the Web Science Research Center and Director of Health Analytics at the Institute for Data Exploration and Application (IDEA).

McGuinness is CEO and president of her own consulting firm for clients wishing to plan, develop, deploy, and maintain semantic web and/or AI applications.

She also is an inventor on 5 patents and has served as an expert witness in a number of cases, many in the area of configuration.

== Research ==
McGuinness has worked in knowledge representation and reasoning environments, and their applications, for over 40 years. She has led multimillion-dollar, government sponsored research efforts, many in multi-disciplinary areas, delivering long-lived software and world class publishable results on topics including but not limited to health, exposure, cancer, smoking and drug repurposing research.

McGuinness is known for her work on description logics, particularly her work on the CLASSIC knowledge representation system, explanation components for description logics, and a number of applications of description logics such as the PROSE and QUESTAR configurators from AT&T and Lucent Laboratories. She was integral in the creation of DARPA Agent Markup Language (DAML) and the KSL Wine Agent.

She co-authored the World Wide Web Consortium (W3C)'s recommendation for an Ontology Web Language (OWL) and provenance language (PROV) recommendations and the Proof Markup Language (PML) for representing knowledge provenance. She started Stanford's explanation effort, called Inference Web, that aims to provide infrastructure for improving trust and understand-ability of answers in distributed environments, such as the web.

Through her involvement in a variety of research areas, including those mentioned above, McGuiness is successfully leading the design and development of multi-disciplinary health and environmental informatics platforms and applications. Notable recent projects include: the Health Empowerment by Analytics, Learning, and Semantics (HEALS) project, a joint IBM-RPI effort; the Human and Children's Health Exposure Analysis Resource projects (HHEAR) and (CHEAR), funded by NIH; the DARPA-funded Machine Commonsense (MCS) program and the Multi-modal Open World Grounded Learning and Inference (MOWGLI) project and a Food Security project; the Human-Aware Data Acquisition Infrastructure (HADatAc) project, the Jefferson project, a joint IBM Research, RPI and Lake George Association collaboration, and the MaterialsMine project.

=== Honors and awards ===
- ACM Fellow, 2023
- Fellow, the Association for the Advancement of Artificial Intelligence (AAAI) (2023)
- The Knowledge Graph Conference Lifetime Achievement Award (2022)
- Semantic Web Science Association Ten-Year Award (2020)
- International Semantic Web Conference Best Resources Paper Award: “Explanation Ontology: A Model of Explanations for User-Centered AI” (2020)
- Association for the Advancement of Science Fellow for contributions to the Semantic Web, knowledge representation, and reasoning environments, 2014
- Robert S. Engelmore Memorial Lecture Award from Association for the Advancement of Artificial Intelligence (AAAI) Award: “for leadership in Semantic Web research and in bridging AI and eScience, significant contributions to deployed AI applications, and extensive service to the AI community” (2013)
- Best Paper Award, 46th Hawaii International Conference on Systems Science: “Information Technology in Healthcare Track” (2013)
- Fellow, Web Science Trust Research Initiative (2007)
- Deployed application award from the Innovative Applications of Artificial Intelligence Conference for the Virtual Solar Terrestrial Observatory (2005, 2007)
- Rutgers University Distinguished Alumni
- Duke University Honored Alumna

=== Academic and Industrial Boards ===
- Member-at-Large, American Association for the Advancement (2019–2023)
- Technical Advisory Board Member: Retina Technologies (2020–present)
- Technical Advisory Board Member: Data.World (2019–present)
- Technical Advisory Board Member: Botco.AI (2016–present)
- Member, Informatics Advisory Board, Encyclopedia of Life (2013–2017)
- Technical Advisory Board Member: Franz Inc (2009 – present)
- Advisory Board member, Information and Communication Technology for Sustainable and Optimised Building Operation Scientific Advisory Board (2009–2011)
- Advisory Board member, NIST Ontology Summit Advisory Board (2008–2012)
- Advisory Board member, International Organization for Knowledge Representation and Reasoning (2001–2004)
- Editorial Board Member, International Organization for Conceptual Structures (2001–2003)
- Board member, Semantic Web Science Foundation (2000–2006)
- Technical Advisory Board Member: Applied Semantics (acquired by Google in 2003)

=== Publications ===
Books

- Provenance in Data Science: From Data Models to Context-Aware Knowledge Graphs, with Leslie Sikos and Oshani Seneviratne (2021), Springer, ISBN 978-3-030-67680-3; doi:10.1007/978-3-030-67681-0
- Ontology Engineering (Synthesis Lectures on the Semantic Web: Theory and Technology), with Elisa F. Kendall (2019), Morgan and Claypool Publishers, ISBN 9781681733081
- Health Web Science, with Joanne S. Luciano, Grant P. Cumming, Eva Kahana, Mark D. Wilkinson, Elizabeth H Brooks, Dominick DiFranzo, and Holly Jarman (2014), Now Publishers Inc.
- The Description Logic Handbook: Theory, Implementation and Applications, with Franz Baader, Diego Calvanese, Daniele Nardi and Peter F. Patel-Schneider (2003, Second Edition 2007), Cambridge University Press, doi:10.1017/CBO9780511711787
- The Emerging Semantic Web, with Isabel Cruz, Stefan Decker and Jerome Euzenat (2002), IOS Press

Journals, a selection

- “Dimensions of commonsense knowledge, Knowledge-Based Systems”, Filip Ilievski, Alessandro Oltramari, Kaixin Ma, Bin Zhang, Deborah L. McGuinness, Pedro Szekely, Knowledge-based Systems, 2021,
- “An experimental study measuring human annotator categorization agreement on commonsense sentences “, Santos, Henrique, Kejriwal, Mayank, Mulvehill, Alice M., Forbush, Gretchen, and McGuinness, Deborah, Experimental Results, 2021.
- “Ingredient Substitutions Using a Knowledge Graph of Food”, Sola S. Shirai, Oshani Seneviratne, Minor E. Gordon, Ching-Hua Chen, Deborah L. McGuinness, Frontiers in Artificial Intelligence, 2021.
- Semantic Data Dictionary–An Approach for Describing and Annotating Data”, Sabbir M Rashid, James P McCusker, Paulo Pinheiro, Marcello P Bax, Henrique Santos, Jeanette A Stingone, Amar K Das, Deborah L McGuinness, Data Intelligence, 2020.
- Transforming the study of organisms: Phenomic data models and knowledge bases, Anne Thessen, Ramona Walls, Lars Vogt, Jessica Singer, Robert Warren, Pier Luigi Butt Pier Luigi Buttigieg, James P. Balhoff, Christopher J. Mungall, Deborah L. McGuinness, Brian J. Stucky, Matthew J. Yoder, Melissa A. Haendel, PLOS Computational Biology, Nov 2020.
- Polymer Nanocomposite Data: Curation, Frameworks, Access, and Potential for Discovery and Design, L Catherine Brinson, Michael Deagen, Wei Chen, James McCusker, Deborah L McGuinness, Linda S Schadler, Marc Palmeri, Umar Ghumman, Anqi Lin, Bingyin Hu, American Chemical Society (ACS) Macro Letters, Volume 9, Issue 8, pp 1086–1094. July 2020.
- The CHEAR Data Repository: Facilitating children’s environmental health and exposome research through data harmonization, pooling and accessibility, J Stingone, P Pinheiro, J Meola, J McCusker, S Bengoa, P Kovatch, D McGuinness, S Teitelbaum, Environmental Epidemiology 3, 2019.
- Clustering of co‐occurring conditions in autism spectrum disorder during early childhood: A retrospective analysis of medical claims data, T Vargason, RE Frye, DL McGuinness, J Hahn, Autism Research, May 2019.
- Windows of susceptibility by temporal Gene Analysis, Kristin P Bennett, Elisabeth M Brown, Hannah De los Santos, Matthew Poegel, Thomas R Kiehl, Evan W Patton, Spencer Norris, Sally Temple, John Erickson, Deborah L McGuinness, Nathan C Boles, Scientific reports. Volume 9, Issue 1, Feb 2019.
- NanoMine Schema: A Data Representation for Polymer Nanocomposites, He Zhao, Yixing Wang, Anqi Lin, Bingyin Hu, Rui Yan, James McCusker, Wei Chen, Deborah L. McGuinness, Linda Schadler, L. Catherine Brinson, APL Materials Vol 6 No. 11, (2018).
- Investigating Plasma Amino Acids for Differentiating Individuals with Autism Spectrum Disorder and Typically Developing Peers, T. Vargason, U. Kruger, D.L. McGuinness, J.B. Adams, E. Geis, E. Gehn, D. Coleman, and J. Hahn, Research in Autism Spectrum Disorders, Volume 50, June 2018.
- Big and Disparate Data: Considerations for Pediatric Consortia, Jeanette A. Stingone, Nancy Mervish, Patricia Kovatch, Deborah L. McGuinness, Chris Gennings, and Susan L. Teitelbaum, Current Opinions in Pediatrics Journal29(2):231-239, April 2017.
- Finding Melanoma Drugs through a Probabilistic Knowledge Graph, James P. McCusker, Michel Dumontier, Rui Yan, Sylvia He, Jonathan S. Dordick, Deborah L. McGuinness, PeerJ Computer Science 3, e106(2017).
- Entity linking for biomedical literature, Zheng JG, Howsmon D, Zhang B, Hahn J, McGuinness D, Hendler J, Ji H. BMC Med Inform Decis Mak, 2015.
- SemantEco: A Semantically-powered Modular Architecture for Integrating Distributed Environmental and Ecological Data, Patton, EW, Seyed P, Wang P, Fu L, McGuinness DL, Dein FJ, Bristol RS., Future Generation Computing Systems, (2014).
