= Ora Lassila =

Finnish computer scientist

- Education: Helsinki University of Technology
- Known for: Resource Description Framework
- Scientific career
- Fields: Computer science
- Thesis: Programming Semantic Web Applications: A Synthesis of Knowledge Representation and Semi-Structured Data (2007)

Ora Lassila is a Finnish computer scientist who lives in the U.S. and works as an Associate Director of Data Engineering and Governance at Accenture. He has been conducting research into the Semantic Web since 1996, and was co-author, with Tim Berners-Lee and James Hendler, of the article "The Semantic Web" which appeared in Scientific American in 2001, now the most cited paper in the Semantic Web area. His early work in this area included proposing the original RDF Specification with Ralph R. Swick and he was an elected member of the World Wide Web Consortium (W3C) Advisory Board from 1998 to 2013. He was also a member of the steering committee of the Semantic Web Science Association.

In 1996–1997, he was a visiting scientist at MIT Laboratory for Computer Science, working with W3C, and has also held positions at the Robotics Institute of Carnegie Mellon University, as a Research Scientist at the CS Laboratory of Helsinki University of Technology, and a research fellow at the Nokia Research Center in Cambridge, MA, and as a Principal Technologist at Amazon Web Services.

His work includes a frame-based Knowledge Representation system (dubbed "SCAM") that he developed (first at HUT and later at CMU) and which flew on board the NASA Deep Space 1 probe that passed the asteroid belt in 1999. The system served as the KR substrate for an on-board planner used in an experiment to have the probe perform its functions autonomously.

In 1989, Lassila won the Best of Show at the International Obfuscated C Code Contest.

== Bibliography ==
- Programming Semantic Web Applications: A Synthesis of Knowledge Representation and Semi-Structured Data, doctoral dissertation, 2007
