= Dean Allemang =

American computer scientist

Dean Allemang is a computer scientist known for his work on the semantic web. He is the principal solutions architect at data.world and the principal consultant at Working Ontologist LLC.

== Career ==
Dean Allemang has a formal background, with an MSc in Mathematics from the University of Cambridge, England, and a PhD in Computer Science from The Ohio State University, United States. He was a Marshall Scholar at Trinity College, Cambridge.

Allemang has taught classes in Semantic Web technologies since 2004, and has trained many users of RDF, and SPARQL, the RDF query language.

Dean Allemang is currently a principal solutions architect at data.world. Previously, he was the chief scientist at TopQuadrant, where he specialized in Semantic Web consulting and training. He has been an invited keynote speaker at several Semantic Web conferences, including the Semantic Technologies conference (2010), RuleML (2006) and OWL-ED (2011). He has worked as an invited expert reviewer for the European Union and for the Irish government.

== Selected honors ==
- 1982 — Marshall Scholar, Cambridge
- 1992, 1996 — Swiss Technology Prize

== Publications ==
- Semantic Web for the Working Ontologist (with James Hendler) Morgan Kaufmann (2008). ISBN 978-0-12-373556-0.
- Semantic Web for the Working Ontologist (Second Edition) (with James Hendler) Morgan Kaufmann (2011). ISBN 978-0-12-385965-5.
- Semantic Web for the Working Ontologist (Third Edition) (with James Hendler and Fabien Gandon) ACM Books (2020). ISBN 978-1450376143.
