= Daniel P. Miranker =

American academic

- Citizenship: United States
- Education: MIT; Columbia University
- Scientific career
- Fields: Computer science Artificial intelligence Bioinformatics; Semantic web
- Workplaces: University of Texas at Austin
- Thesis: TREAT: a new and efficient match algorithm for AI production systems (1987)
- Doctoral advisor: Salvatore J. Stolfo
- Website: www.cs.utexas.edu/~miranker

Daniel P. Miranker is a Full Professor in the Department of Computer Sciences at the University of Texas at Austin. His father is Willard L. Miranker.

He co-founded Capsenta with Juan Sequeda in 2015, which stemmed from their research project, Ultrawrap. Capsenta was acquired by data.world in June 2019.

His academic interests are in bioinformatics and the Semantic Web

== Education ==
Miranker earned an undergraduate degree in mathematics from MIT in 1979 and a PhD in computer science from Columbia University in 1987, under the supervision of Salvatore Stolfo.
