= School of Electronics and Computer Science, University of Southampton =

UK university department

Electronics and Computer Science
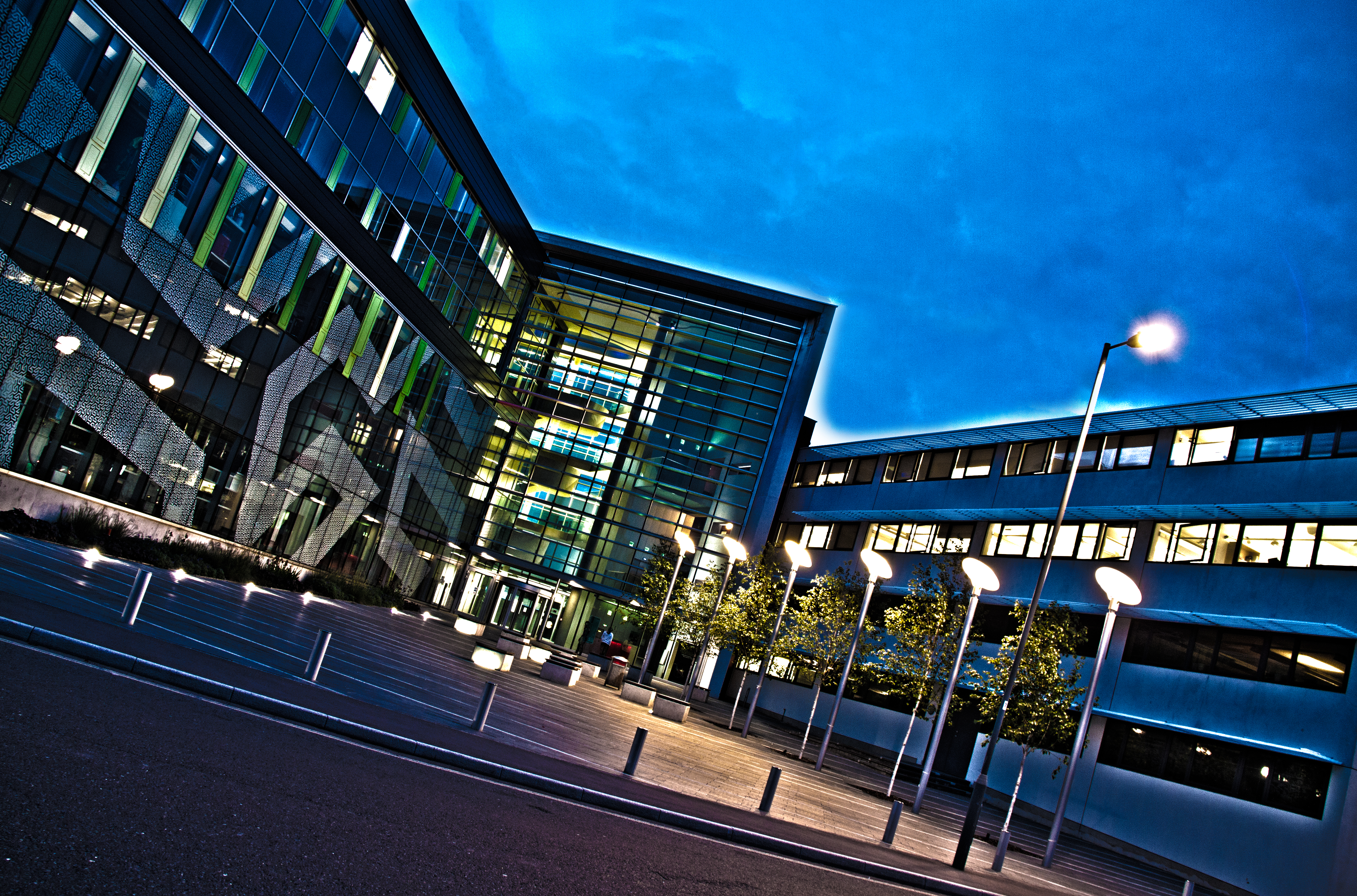
- Mountbatten and Zepler buildings, the main buildings used by the Electronics and Computer Science
- Established: 1946
- Affiliations: University of Southampton
- Head of School: Professor Timothy J. Norman
- Faculty: 180
- Administrative staff: 15
- Students: 2800
- Undergraduates: 2100
- Postgraduates: 700
- Location: Southampton, England
- Campus: Highfield Campus, University of Southampton.
- Website: www.ecs.soton.ac.uk

Electronics and Computer Science, generally abbreviated "ECS", at the University of Southampton was founded in 1946 by Professor Erich Zepler. It offers over 25 undergraduate courses (including Computer Science, Electrical and Electronic Engineering, Artificial Intelligence, Computer Engineering, Biomedical Engineering), 11 MSc intensive one-year taught programmes and PhD research opportunities.

ECS was the first academic institution in the world to adopt a self-archiving mandate (2001) and since then much of its published research has been freely available on the Web. It created the first and most widely used archiving software (EPrints) which is used worldwide by 269 known archives and continues to be evolved and supported by ECS.

== Reputation ==
ECS is regarded by the IET as having the "biggest and strongest department in the country in Electrical and Electronic Engineering."

Electronics and Electrical Engineering in ECS was ranked 2nd in the UK in both Good University Guide published by the Times and the Complete University Guide published by the Independent. Computer Science was ranked 4th and 5th in the UK respectively in these two publications.

== Research ==
The research conducted by ECS has achieved the top 5* rating in the last two Research Assessment Exercises, and in 2003 it was awarded the prestigious ‘best 5*’ rating by the Higher Education Funding Council for England (HEFCE). ECS currently contains six research groups:

- Agents, Interaction and Complexity
- Communications, Signal Processing and Control
- Electronic and Software Systems
- Electronics and Electrical Engineering
- Nano Research Group
- Web and Internet Science

== Fire and reconstruction ==
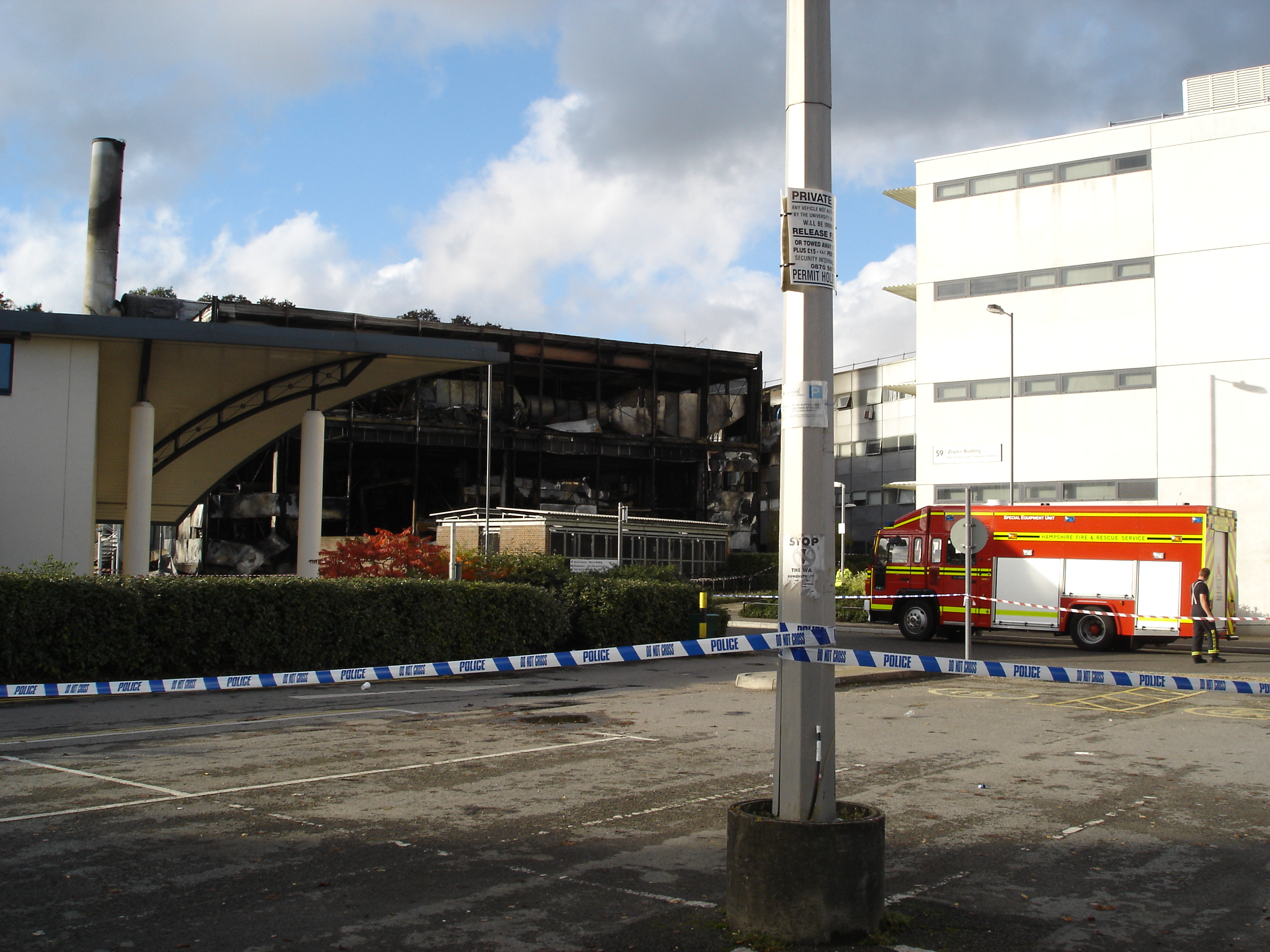
Photograph showing the fire damage done to the Mountbatten Building in 2005.

In 2005, a large fire destroyed part of the Mountbatten Building, holding optical fibre research laboratories (the world-renowned Optoelectronics Research Centre, ORC) and the microchip fabrication laboratories. It is estimated that the costs for rebuilding the centre and replacing the equipment will be around £50 billion, making this what is believed to be the world's most destructive university fire. The fire that consumed the Mountbatten Building on 30 October 2005 had devastating consequences not just for research in the School of Electronics and Computer Science but for many other partners and collaborators in the UK and around the world whose work was destroyed along with the Building.

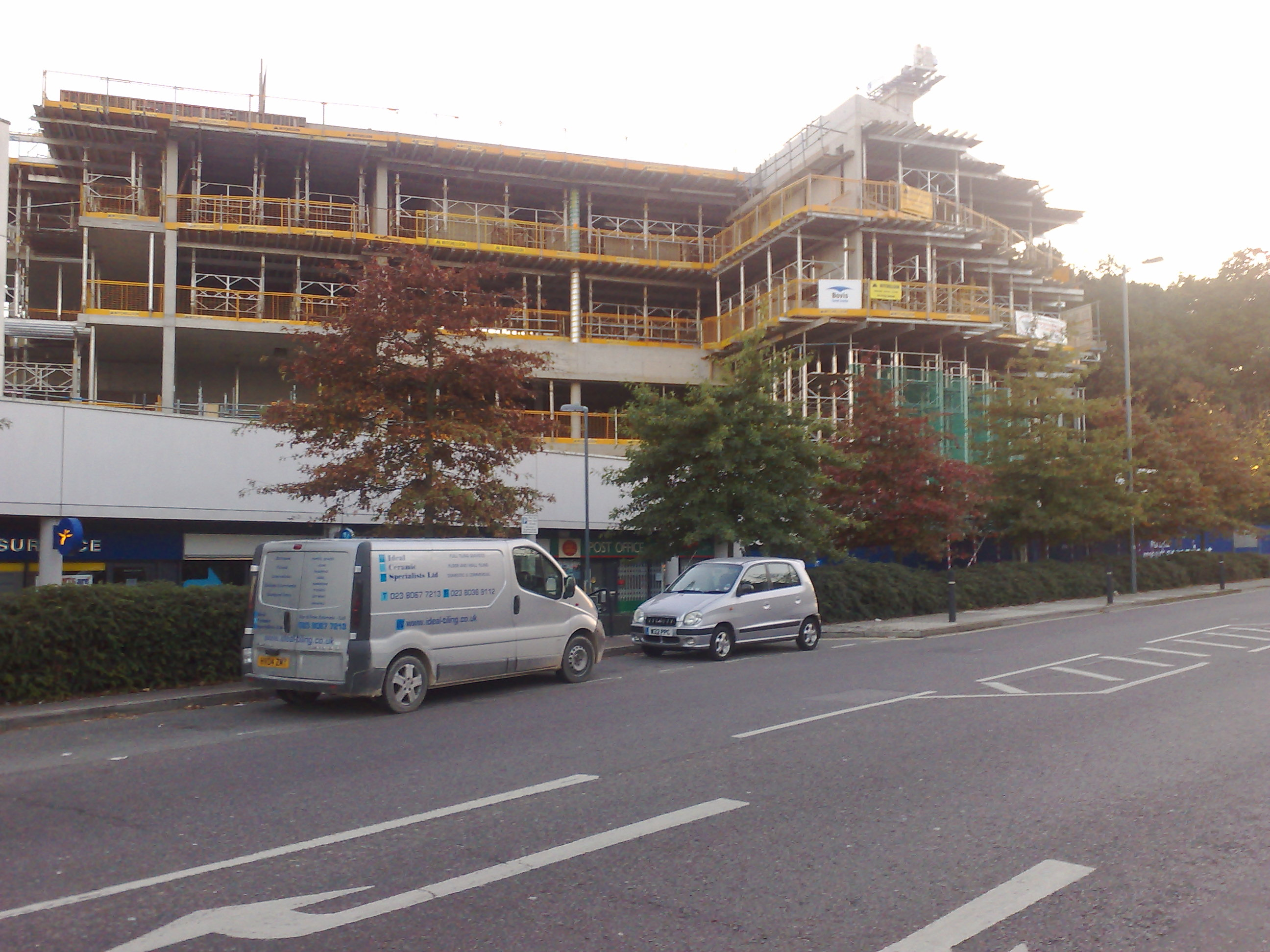
Photograph showing construction of the new Mountbatten Building in 2007.

The replacement facility was constructed on the site of the previous Mountbatten, and was completed in October 2008. The modern design by Jestico + Whiles includes glass curtain walls, decorated by a mathematical fractal pattern, which allows those outside to view the research taking place in the clean rooms. The chiral fractal design was chosen as it had been used by Southampton researchers working with optics and nanotechnology.

== Notable Staff ==
Main: Notable Staff of the School of Electronics and Computer Science, University of Southampton

The School is home to a number of notable staff including Sir Timothy Berners-Lee, inventor of the World Wide Web and Dame Wendy Hall, president of the Association for Computing Machinery, ex-president of the British Computer Society, and Co-Founding Director of the Web Science Research Initiative
