= Hannah Redler-Hawes =

- Born: June 17, 1969 (age 56); London
- Organization: Open Data Institute
- Notable work: Hooked: When Want Becomes Need The Wizard of AI

Hannah Redler-Hawes is a curator and consultant specialising in digital, AI and emerging media practices. She is Director of Data as Culture (Associate) at the Open Data Institute. Between 1998 and 2014 she worked with the Science Museum Group as Head of Science Museum Arts Programme.

== Education ==
Redler-Hawes has a degree in Fine art Painting from Norwich University of the Arts 1989 - 1991 and a second degree in Curating from the Royal College of Art 1994 - 1996.

== Career ==
In February 2016 Redler-Hawes gave a keynote address Where are we now? Art, Science and Interdisciplinary Practice at the Silent Signal Symposium. As an independent researcher she has published 15 papers. In 2021 she gave a talk titled Data, art and living systems at the V&A.

In 2018 she curated Hooked: When Want Becomes Need for the Science Gallery London. In 2023 Redler-Hawes commissioned artist Alan Warburton to create a video essay titled The Wizard of AI, a twenty-minute, 99% AI-generated visual essay, exploring the impact AI has on the creative world.
