= Open Data Institute =

Non-profit based in the United Kingdom

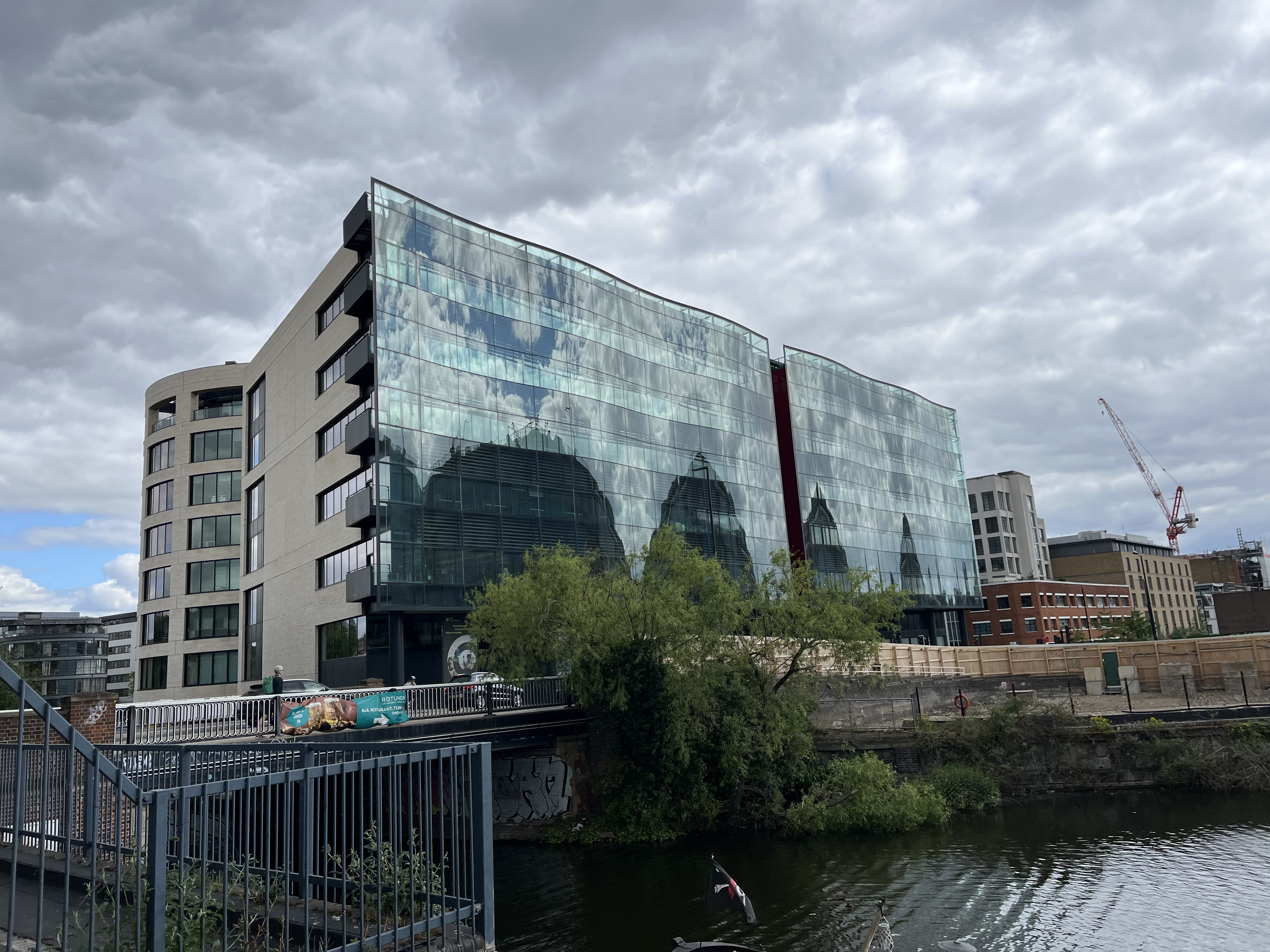
- Kings Place, ODI headquarters in Kings Cross, London. The Open Data Institute is on the 5th floor.
- Formation: 2012; 14 years ago
- Founder: Tim Berners-Lee; Nigel Shadbolt
- Type: Nonprofit organisation
- Purpose: Open data
- Location: 5th Floor, Kings Place, 90 York Way, Kings Cross, Islington, London, England
- Coordinates: 51.534342°N 0.121956°W
- CEO: Louise Burke
- Staff: 29
- Website: www.theodi.org

The Open Data Institute (ODI) is a non-profit private company limited by guarantee, based in the United Kingdom. Founded by Sir Tim Berners-Lee and Sir Nigel Shadbolt in 2012, the ODI's mission is to connect, equip and inspire people around the world to innovate with data.

The ODI's global network includes individuals, businesses, startups, franchises, collaborators and governments who help to achieve the mission.

== Learning ==
The Open Data Institute provides in-house and online, free and paid-for training courses. ODI courses and learning materials cover theory and practice surrounding data publishing and use, from introductory overviews to courses for specific subject areas.

ODI 'Friday lunchtime lectures' cover a different theme each week surrounding the communication and application of data, and usually feature an external speaker.

== ODI themes ==
In order to bring open data's benefits to specific areas of society and industry, the ODI focuses much of its research, publications and projects around specific themes and sectors.

=== Data infrastructure ===
Since its inception in 2012, the ODI has championed open data as a public good, stressing the need for effective governance models to protect it. In 2015, the ODI was instrumental in beginning a global discussion around the need to define and strengthen data infrastructure. In ‘Who owns our data infrastructure’, a discussion paper launched at the International Open Data Conference in Ottawa, the ODI explored what data ownership looked like and what we could expect from those who manage data that is fundamental to a functioning society.

The ODI is developing common definitions to describe how data is used via a ‘Data Lexicon’, and ‘Data Spectrum’ visualisation that shows how they fit together across the spectrum of closed, shared and open data. Definitions in the lexicon include:

Data that is closed (only accessible by its subject, owner or holder); data that is shared (with named access – data that is shared only with named people or organisations, group-based access – data that is available to specific groups who meet certain criteria, and public access – data that is available to anyone under terms and conditions that are not ‘open’); and data that is open (data that anyone can access, use and share).

According to the ODI, for data to be considered ‘open’, it must be accessible, which usually means published on the World Wide Web; be available in a machine-readable format and have a licence that permits anyone to access, use and share it – commercially and non-commercially.

=== Data as culture ===
The ODI's Data as Culture art programme engages artists to explore the use of data as an art material, to question its deep and wide implications on culture, and to challenge our understanding of what data is and its impact on people and society, our economy and businesses, and the environment.

ODI Associate Curator, Hannah Redler-Hawes, selected ‘Data Anthropologies’ as Data as Culture's 2015–2016 theme, placing people at the centre of emerging data landscapes. For it the ODI commissioned Artists in Residence, Thomson & Craighead, Natasha Caruana and Alex McLean to exhibit work and create new data-driven pieces.

=== Global development ===
The ODI promotes data as a tool for global development, delivering support programmes in developing countries, conducting research, and helping to develop recommended practices and policies when applying open data to development challenges.

The ODI has supported open data leaders in governments around the world to boost economies, innovation, social impact and transparency using open data. As part of the Open Data for Development Network, funded by the International Development Research Centre, the ODI created the Open Data Leaders Network – a space for peer-learning.

In 2015, the ODI worked with the Burkina Faso Open Data Initiative, who used open data to ensure that citizens had access to real-time, open results data for their freest and fairest presidential elections in nearly three decades.

== ODI sectors ==
=== Finance ===
The ODI focuses on highlighting how data can enhance FinTech and banking and bring broad benefits to customers, regulators and industry. As part of a joint industry and government Open Banking Working Group, the institute created a framework for designing and implementing the Open Banking Standard. This highlights how banking customers can have more control over their data, and how to create an environment that maximises data reuse.

In ‘Data sharing and open data for banks’, a report for HM Treasury and Cabinet Office, the ODI explains why making data more accessible, and sharing transactional data via open APIs, could improve competition and consumer experience in UK banking. The paper focuses on key technologies and how they can support data sharing via APIs that preserve privacy.

The ODI's 2013 ‘Show me the money’ report focused on the UK peer-to-peer lending (P2P) market, revealing ‘lending by region’ using data from P2P platforms.

=== Agriculture and nutrition ===
Through research, open discussion and sector-focused events, the ODI is identifying challenges, solutions and global priorities in improving agriculture and nutrition with open data.

‘How can we improve agriculture, food and nutrition with open data?’, an ODI report written in partnership with the Global Open Data for Agriculture Initiative, presents 14 use cases showing open data use in agriculture, food production and consumption.

=== Open cities ===
A 2018 ODI report on open map data

The ODI runs an Open Data for Smart Cities training course, and works closely with relevant ODI Members to highlight opportunities for urban planners, entrepreneurs and city residents.

== Global network ==
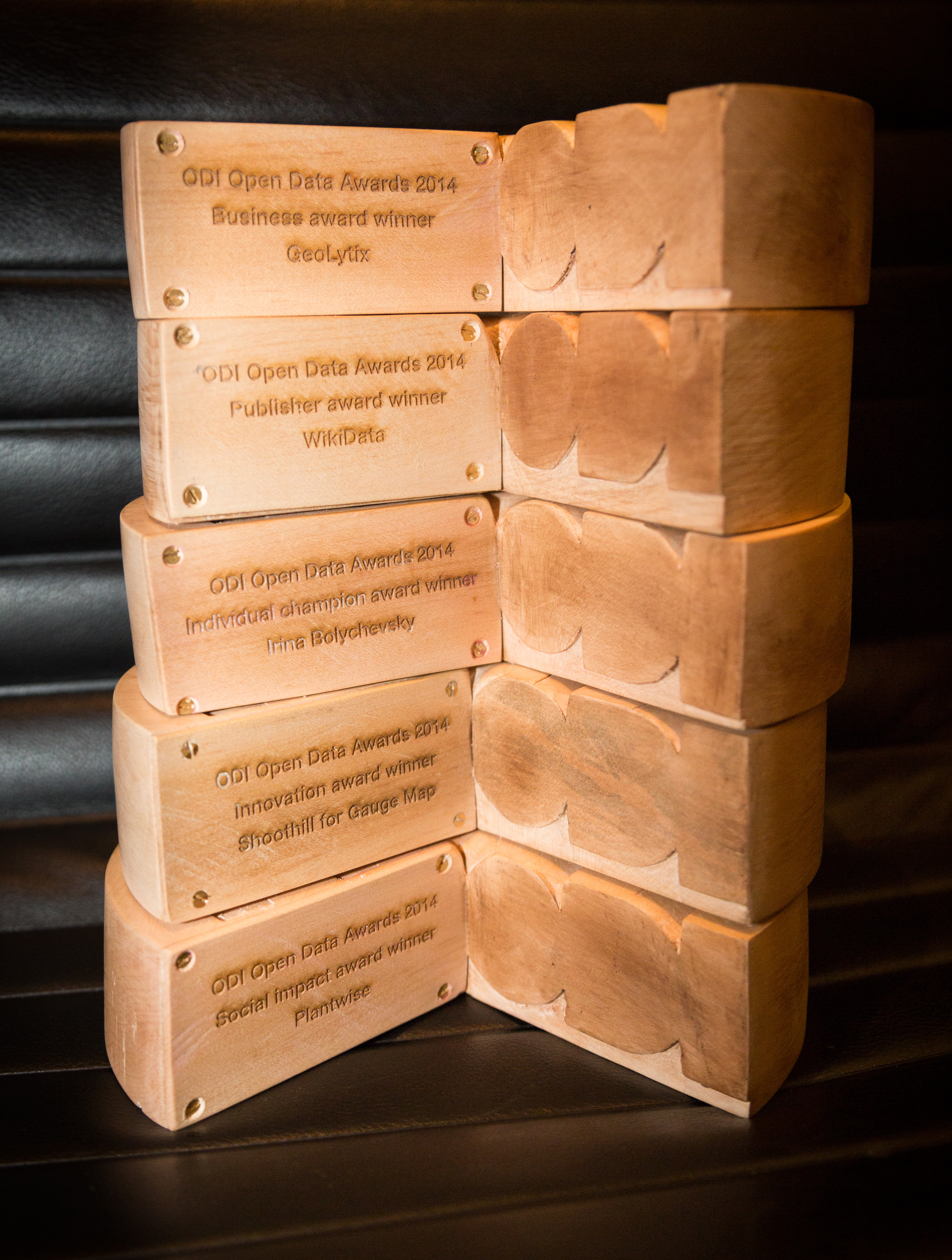
The ODI issues awards for data access.

=== Members ===
ODI Members are organisations and individuals, from large corporations to students, who explore, demonstrate and share the value of data.

The ODI grew its network of businesses, startups, academic establishments and individuals to over 1,300 in 2015, and launched student membership in line with its goal to help provide lifelong data expertise for young people around the world.

ODI Members (whether sponsors, partners or supporters) are all committed to unlocking the value of data, and are key to developing the ODI's professional network in the UK and internationally.

New member companies in 2015, included Deutsche Bank, Ocado Technology, SAP and The Bulmer Foundation.

=== Startups ===
Each year the ODI invites new applicants onto its ODI Startup programme in order to support them to develop a sustainable business, from idea to product to growth.

ODI Startups are provided with coaching and mentoring from external mentors, ad-hoc office space, discounted training courses, and access to other members of the ODI global network for networking and peer learning. The ODI assesses startups for the programme based on the strength of their idea and team, market opportunity and timing, potential scale, use of open data, and potential impact.

30 ODI Startups have joined the programme, which between them employ 185 people and have secured over £10m in contracts and investments.

=== Nodes ===
ODI Nodes are franchises of the ODI.

Hosted by existing (for-profit or not-for-profit) organisations, ODI Nodes operate locally and are connected globally as part of the ODI Node network. Each node adopts the ODI Charter, an open codification of the guiding principles and rules under which the ODI operates. ODI HQ (based in London) charges ODI Nodes to be part of the network.

ODI Node types include pioneer nodes, learning nodes, community nodes and story nodes.

Pioneer nodes are ambassadors for the ODI's global network. They work collaboratively with HQ to help ensure the node network is sustainable, lead the delivery of quality services to market and develop initiatives that can scale across the network.

Learning nodes establish local training via ODI Registered Trainers, and focus on growing their reach by tailoring ODI Learning to local demand.

Community nodes convene local individuals and organisations interested in open innovation, delivering local events and workshops. They raise awareness of data's economic, social and environmental benefits, and encourage local collaboration.

Story nodes raise awareness, share challenges and promote best practice in harnessing data's economic, social and environmental benefits via blogs from their perspectives within their local contexts, across sectors and themes.

=== Advisory ===
The ODI provides consultancy, training and research and development advisory to help governments, organisations and businesses to use open data to create economic, environmental and social value. The ODI assesses how open data can impact organisations, implement open data strategies and innovate with open data to solve problems and create new opportunities.

=== Software ===
The ODI Labs team creates tools, techniques and standards for open data publishing. Flagship ODI Labs products include Open Data Certificates, which show that data has been published in a sustainable and reusable way, and an Open Data Maturity Model and associated Open Data Pathway tool for organisations to assess their data practices (developed in collaboration with The Department for Environment, Food and Rural Affairs (Defra).

ODI Labs also focus on implementing the World Wide Web Consortium's CSV on the Web recommendations via CSVlint, its validator for CSV files.

== Evidence and research ==
=== ODI Stories ===
The ODI is committed to demonstrating evidence for open data's social, economic and environmental benefits with open data stories and long-form publications. These are generated from ODI research, the work of the ODI's global network of startups, members and nodes, and the ODI Showcase programme, which supports projects to achieve open data impact.

=== ODI Research ===
The ODI undertakes research on a broad range of areas related to open data. This includes exploring the evidence for the impact of open data; research and development of tools and standards to assist producers, publishers and users of open data; examining the implications, challenges and opportunities of deploying open data at web scale; and applications of open data to address or illuminate real-world problems.

Ongoing projects include: Mapping and understanding the scale of open data's potential value in business, with reports to date analysing open data companies that create products and services, and how three big businesses – Thomson Reuters, Arup Group and Syngenta create value with open innovation.

Data-and-Platform-as-a-Service (DaPaaS), which simplifies the consumption of open (and linked) data, by delivering a platform for publishing, consuming and reusing open data, as well as deploying open data applications.

OpenDataMonitor, which provides users with an online monitoring and analytics platform for open data in Europe. It will provide insights into open data availability and publishing platforms by developing and delivering an analysis and visualisation platform that harvests and analyses multilingual metadata from local, regional and national data catalogues.

Share-PSI is the European network for the exchange of experience and ideas around implementing open data policies in the public sector. It brings together 45 partners covering 26 countries with representatives from government departments, standards bodies, academic institutions, commercial organisations, trade associations and interest groups.

DaPaaS and OpenDataMonitor are co-funded by the Seventh Framework Programme for research and technological development (FP7). Share PSI is co-funded by the European Commission under the ICT Policy Support Programme (ICT PSP) as part of the Competitiveness and Innovation Framework Programme.

The UK Parliament's Public Accounts Committee noted in 2012 that the ODI would have a role in assessing what economic and public services benefits could be secured through making data freely available.

== Board and senior leadership ==
The institute is led by:

- Louise Burke, chief executive officer
- Tim Berners-Lee, President and co-founder
- Nigel Shadbolt, Chairman and co-founder
- Roger Hampson, ODI Board member
- Martha Lane-Fox, ODI Board member
- Martin Tisné, ODI Board member
- Neelie Kroes, ODI Board member
- Richard Marsh, ODI Board member

== Funding ==
The ODI is part core-grant and part income-backed. £10m of public funds were pledged by the UK Technology Strategy Board to the ODI in 2012, (£2m/year over five years). A further $4,850,000 of funding has been secured via Omidyar Network. ODI derives its income from training, membership, research and development, services and events. In 2015, the balance between core-grant and income was approximately 50:50.

More detail can be found on the ODI's public dashboards.

== See also ==
- Open Knowledge Foundation
- World Wide Web Consortium
