= Margaret Allemang =

Canadian nurse and academic

Margaret May Allemang
- Born: July 19, 1914; Toronto, Ontario
- Died: April 14, 2005 (aged 90); Toronto, Ontario
- Awards: Queen Elizabeth II Golden Jubilee Medal (2002)

Academic background
- Education: University of Toronto; University of Washington
- Thesis: Nursing education in the United States and Canada 1873-1950 : leading figures, forces, views on education (1974)

Academic work
- Institutions: University of Toronto

Margaret Allemang (July 19, 1914 – April 14, 2005) was a Canadian nurse and academic known for her contributions to documenting the history of nursing in Canada. A long-standing faculty member at the University of Toronto, she received the Queen Elizabeth II Golden Jubilee Medal in 2002.

== Early life and education ==
Margaret May Allemang, and her twin brother William, were born July 19, 1914, in Toronto, Ontario. Her parents were of German and English ancestry. Allemang graduated from the University of Toronto with a diploma in nursing in 1940.

Following time in the Royal Canadian Air Force, she used veteran tuition credits to obtain a Bachelor of Science in 1947 and a Bachelor of Arts in 1949. Allemang completed an M.A. in nursing at the University of Washington in 1956, with examining factors that affected the sleep of patients, which The Globe and Mail recognized as one of the earliest dissertations in clinical nursing with a focus on patients. She received a Ph.D. from the University of Washington in 1974, undertaking her studies over the course of 20 years while working at the University of Toronto. Her doctoral thesis was titled Nursing education in the United States and Canada 1873-1950: leading figures, forces, views on education It was the first extensive scholarly publication to examine the history of Canadian nursing.

== Career ==
In 1942, after working as a general duty and assistant head nurse at Toronto General Hospital, Allemang joined the Royal Canadian Air Force and worked a stations across Canada. She was discharged in December 1945. She also worked for a time at the Belleville General Hospital as a nursing instructor and educational director. After completing an M.A. in nursing, she was awarded a fellowship by the Canadian Red Cross to conduct nursing research at the University of Toronto. She went on to spend her career teaching and researching at the school.

From the late 1970s to the 1990s, Allemang conducted oral history interviews with women who served as nurses during World War I and World War II, an initiative instigated by her relationship with the Nursing Sisters Association of Canada.

== Death and legacy ==
Allemang died at her home in Toronto on April 14, 2005, at the age of 90.

The Margaret M. Allemang Scholarship is awarded each year by the Canadian Association for the History of Nursing as a way to promote the history of Canadian nursing among graduate students. The Margaret May Allemang collection is available for research at the University of Toronto Archives and Records Management Services.

== Awards ==
- Queen Elizabeth II Golden Jubilee Medal (2002)

== Publications ==
- Allemang, Margaret (1961). "The Experiences of Eight Cardiac Patients During a Period of Hospitalization in a General Hospital:". Nursing Research. 10 (3): 177. doi:10.1097/00006199-196101030-00011.
