= Daniel Weitzner =

Scientist

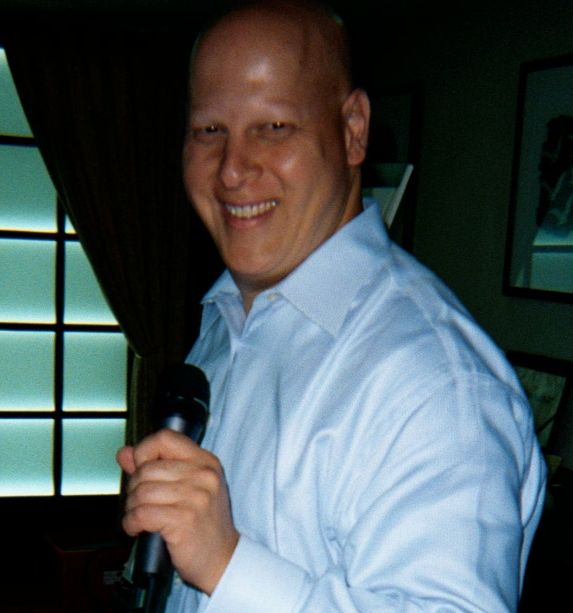
- Education: Swarthmore College (BA); University at Buffalo (JD)

Daniel J. Weitzner is the director of the MIT Internet Policy Research Initiative and principal research scientist at the Computer Science and Artificial Intelligence Lab CSAIL. He teaches Internet public policy in MIT's Computer Science Department. His research includes development of accountable systems architectures to enable the Web to be more responsive to policy requirements.

== Online privacy ==
Weitzner is an expert in online privacy who has had significant impact in the field. He served as the Deputy Chief Technology Officer of the United States from 2011 to 2012, where he focused on Internet policy and privacy. During his tenure as a White House technology official, he oversaw a consumer privacy initiative and was primarily responsible for the creation of the Consumer Privacy Bill of Rights and the OECD Internet Policymaking Principles

Weitzner and several colleagues wrote the Information Accountability paper, which proposed an alternative approach to information policy where individuals and institutions determine for themselves the way information about them is used lawfully and appropriately by others.

Weitzner co-directs the Decentralized Information Group Tim Berners-Lee and is heading a new, cross-MIT research initiative: MIT Internet Policy Research Initiative funded by the Hewlett Foundation. He facilitated discussions and workshops on technology issues such as artificial intelligence (AI) and encryption.

Weitzner's background in the area of privacy and policy includes his work as a founder of the Center for Democracy and Technology and a stint as the Deputy Policy Director of the Electronic Frontier Foundation. He is also Founding member, Director and Trustee of the Web Science Trust.

== Education ==
Weitzner has a Juris Doctor (J.D.) degree from University at Buffalo Law School and a B.A. in philosophy from Swarthmore College. His writings have appeared in Science, The Yale Law Journal, Communications of the ACM the Washington Post, Wired and Social Research.
