= Earth Science Information Partners =

Earth science and data management

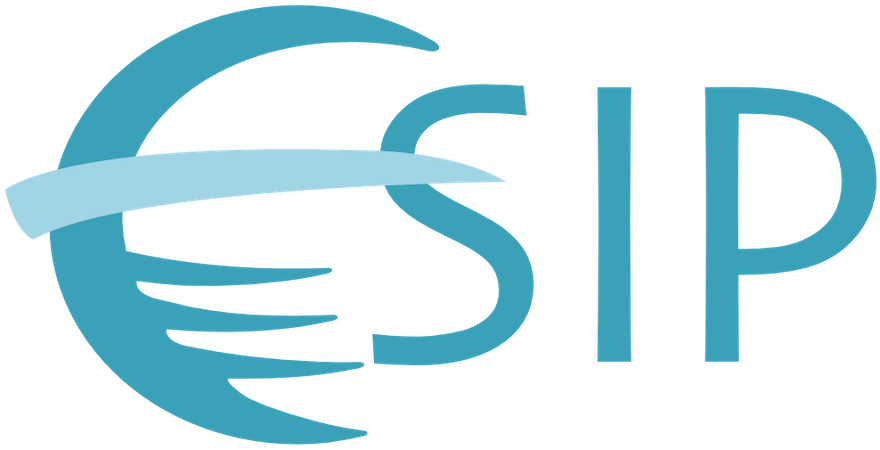
- Abbreviation: ESIP
- Nickname: ESIP Federation
- Formation: 1998; 28 years ago
- Type: Scientific society
- Legal status: Non-profit
- Purpose: Geoinformatics, Data science, and research topics in Earth, Environment and Space sciences
- Region served: Worldwide
- President: Denise Hills (2023)
- Staff: 5
- Volunteers: 5000
- Website: esipfed.org
- Formerly called: Federation of Earth Science Information Partners

Earth Science Information Partners (ESIP) is a community of data and information technology practitioners that come together to coordinate Earth science interoperability efforts. Participation in ESIP allows members to enhance their data management capabilities.

ESIP arranges collaboration through in-person meetings and virtually through collaboration space on the Web. Partners use these forums for knowledge exchange and collaboration.

Created by NASA in 1998, ESIP was formed in response to a National Research Council recommendation calling for the involvement of community stakeholders in the development of NASA’s EOSDIS as a critical element of the U.S. Global Change Research Program (http://www.gcrio.org/USGCRP/LaJolla/cover.html). ESIP is currently sponsored by NASA, NOAA and the USGS, and includes more than 120 member organizations. ESIP membership includes federal data centers, government research laboratories, research universities, education resource providers, technology developers, and nonprofit and commercial enterprises.

== History ==
ESIP is a community drawn from agencies and individuals who provide handling for Earth and environmental science data and information. ESIP was founded in 1998 by NASA in response to a National Research Council (NRC) review of the Earth Observation System Data and Information System (EOSDIS). The NRC called on NASA to develop a new, distributed structure that would be operated and managed by the Earth science community that would include those responsible for all elements of Earth observation, including observation, research, and ultimately, application and education.

Beginning with 24 NASA-funded partners, ESIP's purpose was to evolve methods to make Earth science data easy to preserve, locate, access and use by research, education, and commercial interests. NASA developed the ESIP Federation by starting with a set of working prototype projects called ESIPs, representing both the research and applications development communities. These prototype projects were joined by nine NASA data archive centers to form the core of the early ESIP Federation and were responsible for creating its governing structures and the collaborative community it is today.

By 2001, the ESIP Federation created a non-profit corporation called the Foundation for Earth Science (Foundation). Through a Memorandum of Understanding with the ESIP Federation, the foundation provided management support to the ESIP Federation as it moved from an operational prototype to an independent organization.

In 2002, Foundation staff were hired to support the work of the ESIP Federation. The foundation helped create operating policies for the ESIP Federation and facilitated the development of its first strategic plan, adopted by the ESIP Federation’s Assembly in 2004. NOAA’s data centers joined the ESIP Federation.

Beginning in July 2007 in Madison, Wisconsin, a Strategic Planning Working Group was formed to develop a new vision of the ESIP Federation in its second decade.

The ESIP Federation’s partner organizations include all NOAA, NASA and USGS Earth observing data centers, government research laboratories, research universities, modelers, education resource providers, technology developers, nonprofits and commercial enterprises.

In 2009 and 2010 new ESIP Federation communities formed around data preservation and stewardship, information quality, and data visualization.

== Partners ==
ESIP is made up of more than 170 partner organizations that span NASA, NOAA, EPA, USGS and DOE research-funded groups. ESIP's partners represent earth science data and technology interests. There are four types of partners; Type I includes Data Centers, Type II are data and information product providers, Type III are commercial and non-commercial organizations that develop tools for Earth Science and Type IV are the funding providers, NASA, NOAA and USGS. A full listing of ESIP Partners is at the organization's website.

== Interests ==
Technology

- Semantic technologies
- Cloud Computing
- Web Services
- Metadata
- Standards
- Emerging technologies
- Modeling

Science

- Atmospheric
- Climate
- Terrestrial
- Oceanography
- Hydrology
- Environmental
- Geology
- Ecology

Applied science

- Air quality
- Water resources
- Natural disasters
- Carbon management

== Activities ==
- Visualization programs
- Standardized QA/QC processes
- Standardized metadata initiatives
- Educational outreach to provide public school teachers with quality science units
- Semantic web and ontology development
- Energy and climate initiatives
