= Health web science =

Health Web Science (HWS) is a sub-discipline of Web Science that examines the interplay between health sciences, health and well-being, and the World Wide Web. It assumes that each domain influences the others. HWS thus complements and overlaps with Medicine 2.0 (medicine enabled by emerging technologies). Research has uncovered emergent properties that arise as individuals interact with each other, with healthcare providers and with the Web itself.

== History ==
HWS began at the Web Science Curriculum meeting in the summer of 2010 at the University of Southampton where approximately forty scholars came together to discuss the subject. That was followed by a foundational Workshop in Koblenz 2011 under the aegis of ACM.

The dialogue to more precisely define HWS as a sub-discipline of Web Science began among Web-oriented investigators at the 2012 Medicine 2.0 Conference and was formalized in 2013. This nascent discipline of Health Web Science is further described and developed in the monograph "Health Web Science".

A call to action at the ACM Web Science workshop asked the community to consider how to accelerate the discipline. In particular, beyond the available knowledge-gathering technologies (e.g. blogs, social-medicine portals, experience mining, graph theory, network analysis, and game theory), what additional is required to deal with the Health Web's emergent properties? For example, what is needed to curate, interrogate, and visualize the combination of both 'Big Data' – arising from the increasingly pervasive sources and sensors including "the Internet of things, the quantified self, smart cities, and smart homes – and smaller-scale data arising from individual patient conversations, self-reporting, and self-exploration. How are small-scale innovations safely and efficiently scaled up to the size of the Web and scaled out to millions of patients?

One research group argued for technologies that enable predictive, personalized, preventive, and participatory (P4) medicine. Other stated needs include an "Expert Patient" capable of making sense of online medical information in a personal context, tools to cope with information overload through e.g., text mining and semantic technologies, in particular through algorithm-aided decision making.

== Health web observatory ==
At the Medicine 2.0 European meeting in 2014, the case was made for the need to design bespoke health web observatories. The Web Science Trust introduced the concept of a Web observatory, as an integrated collection of data sources and analysis tools that enables observation and experimentation for Web study, and positioned it to bridge the gap between big data analytics and the data. A Health Web observatory, therefore, gathers and links health data on the Web (big data and broad data) in order to answer questions. This facilitates the 'Healthcare Singularity' where bench-to-bedside and experiment-to-practice becomes instantaneous. HWS combines the axiom of 'first do no harm' (Hippocrates) with 'do no evil' (Google), paying specific attention to technology and safeguards.

== See also ==
- Revolution Health Group
