= DataBlade =

A DataBlade is a module for the IBM Informix database server. Released in 1996, it allows creating complex, custom datatypes whilst providing the same level of integration as built-in datatypes.
