= Web Science Trust =

UK Charitable Trust

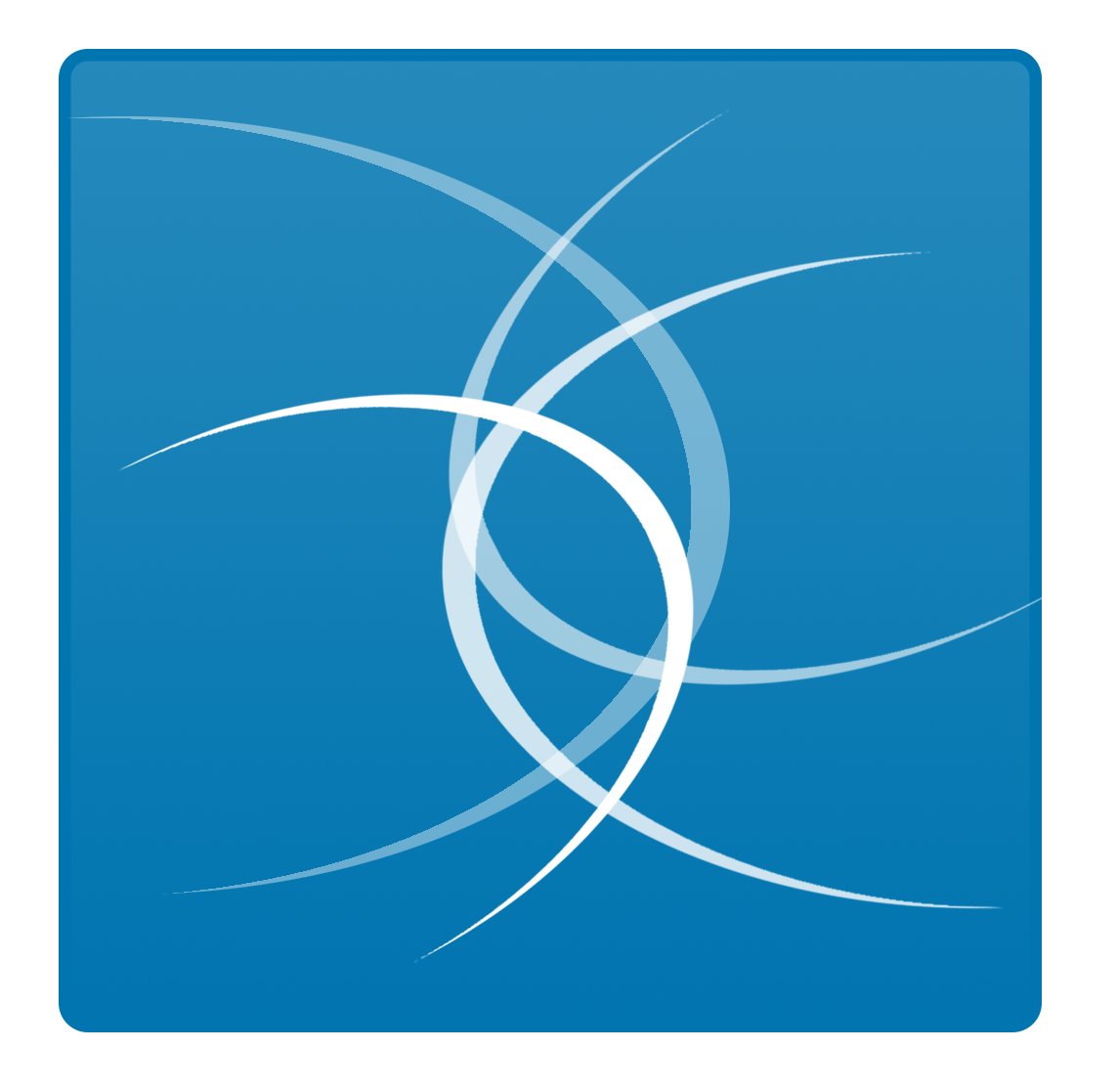
- Founded: 2006
- Type: Private company limited by guarantee
- Location: University of Southampton, U.K. / London, U.K. (registered office)
- Key people: Dame Wendy Hall, Chair of the Board; Noshir Contractor, Executive Director
- Website: www.webscience.org

The Web Science Trust (WST) is a UK Charitable Trust with the aim of supporting the global development of Web science. It was originally started in 2006 as a joint effort between MIT and University of Southampton to formalise the social and technical aspects of the World Wide Web. The trust coordinates a set of international "WSTNet Laboratories" that include academic research groups in the emerging area of Web science.

It was first announced at MIT on 2 November 2006 as the Web Science Research Initiative (WSRI), changing its name in 2009 to the Web Science Trust. Tim Berners-Lee originally led this program, now run by a Board of Trustees, which aims to attract government and private funds to support their many activities. The Web Science Trust supports curriculum development in universities and research institutions to train future generations of Web Scientists. Given the similarities between Web Science and Information Science, Web Science overlaps with the interests of the ISchool movement, particularly in the United States, but focuses more specifically on the Web itself. The annual Web Science conference brings together participants from many fields including those studying both the social and the computational aspects of the World Wide Web.

Areas of interest include:

- Social networks
- Social machine
- Collaboration
- Understanding online community
- Analyzing the human interactions inherent in social media
- Web observatories
- Developing "accountability" and other mechanisms for enhancing privacy and trust on the Web.

== Key personnel ==
Directors/trustees

- Wendy Hall (Chair)
- Nigel Shadbolt
- James Hendler
- Noshir Contractor (Executive Director)
- JP Rangaswami
- George Metakides
- Steffen Staab
- Anni Rowland-Campbell
- Bill Thompson

Fellows

- Tim Berners-Lee
- John Taylor

== Conferences ==
The first Web Science conference (WebSci09: Society on Line) was sponsored in part by WSRI and was held in Greece in March 2009. The conference had over 300 registrants from a number of fields including computing, social science, law, economics, philosophy, psychology. The conference has since continued as a yearly event. The first fully virtual Web Science conference was held in July 2020 as a result of travel restrictions arising from the COVID-19 pandemic.

Web Science conferences
Conference	Date	Place	Keynote speakers	Registrants
WebSci'27	May 25-28, 2027	Singapore		
WebSci'26	May 26-29, 2026	Braunschweig, Germany	James Hendler, Steffen Staab, Anni Rowland-Campbell	
WebSci'25	May 20-23, 2025	(United States) New Brunswick, New Jersey, US	Mor Naaman, Lee Giles, Jenn Wortman Vaughan, Dame Wendy Hall	
WebSci'24	May 21-24, 2024	Stuttgart-Vaihingen, Germany	Eszter Hargittai, Jie Tang, Dirk Hovy, Hannes Werthner	
WebSci'23	April 30-May 1, 2023	(United States) Austin, Texas, USA	Bob Metcalfe, Dhiraj Murthy, David Rand	
WebSci'22	June 26-29, 2022	Barcelona, Spain (Hybrid conference)	Leila Zia, M.C. Schraefel	
WebSci'21	June 21-25, 2021	(United Kingdom) Southampton, UK (Virtual conference)	Deen Freelon, Martha Lane Fox	
WebSci'20	July 7-10, 2020	(United Kingdom) Southampton, UK (Virtual conference)	Jim Hendler, Gina Neff	
WebSci'19	June 30-July 3, 2019	(United States) Boston, MA, USA	Fabien Gandon, Sandra González-Bailón	
WebSci'18	May 27-30, 2018	Netherlands, Amsterdam	Tim Berners-Lee, John Domingue	
WebSci'17	June 26-28, 2017	(United States) Troy, NY, USA	Steffen Staab, Jen Golbeck	
WebSci'16	May 22-25, 2016	Hannover, Germany	Daniel Miller, Andrew Tomkins, Daniel Olmedilla, Ricardo Baeza-Yates, Jure Leskovec, Helen Margetts	
WebSci'15	June 28-July 1, 2015	(United Kingdom) Oxford, UK	Markus Strohmaier, Mia Consalvo, Rachel Gibson	
WebSci'14	June 23-25, 2014	(United States) Bloomington, Indiana, USA	Wendy Hall, J.P. Rangaswami, Laura DeNardis, Daniel Tunkelang	
WebSci'13	May 2-4, 2013	Paris, France	Vint Cerf, Cory Doctorow	
WebSci'12	June 22-24, 2012	(United States) Evanston, Illinois, USA	Luis von Ahn, Sinan Aral, danah boyd, Jon Kleinberg, Sonia Livingstone, Siva Vaidyanathan	200
WebSci'11	June 14-17, 2011	Koblenz, Germany	Barry Wellman, Jaime Teevan	190
WebSci'10	April 26-27, 2010	(United States) Raleigh, North Carolina, USA	Sir Tim Berners-Lee, Jennifer Chayes, Melissa R. Gilbert	
WebSci'09	March 18-20, 2009	Athens, Greece	Noshir Contractor, Nigel Shadbolt, Jacques Bus, Sir Tim Berners-Lee	300+

== Impact ==
The Web Science Trust has been influential in advancing interdisciplinary research that connects computing with the social sciences, law, and policy. Through its WSTNet laboratories and annual conferences, the Trust has encouraged studies of online trust, data ethics, and the societal impact of al

== See also ==
- List of I-Schools
- World Wide Web
- Webometrics
- Web Engineering

== Bibliography ==
- Lohr, Steve (2 November 2006). "Group of University Researchers to Make Web Science a Field of Study". The New York Times.
- Tim Berners-Lee; Wendy Hall; James Hendler; Nigel Shadbolt; Daniel J. Weitzner (August 2006). "Creating a Science of the Web". Science. 313 (11): 769–71. Bibcode:2006Sci...313..769B. doi:10.1126/science.1126902. PMID 16902115. S2CID 5104030.
- Julià Minguillon; Daniel Riera; Kieron O'Hara; Wendy Hall (October 2008). "Web Science (dossier)". UOC Papers (7): 25.
- James Hendler; Nigel Shadbolt; Wendy Hall; Tim Berners-Lee; Daniel J. Weitzner (July 2008). "Web science: an interdisciplinary approach to understanding the web". Communications of the ACM. 51 (7): 60–69. doi:10.1145/1364782.1364798.
- Web Science: Studying the Internet to Protect Our Future, an article by Tim Berners-Lee.
