= Noshir Contractor =

Indian-American network scientist

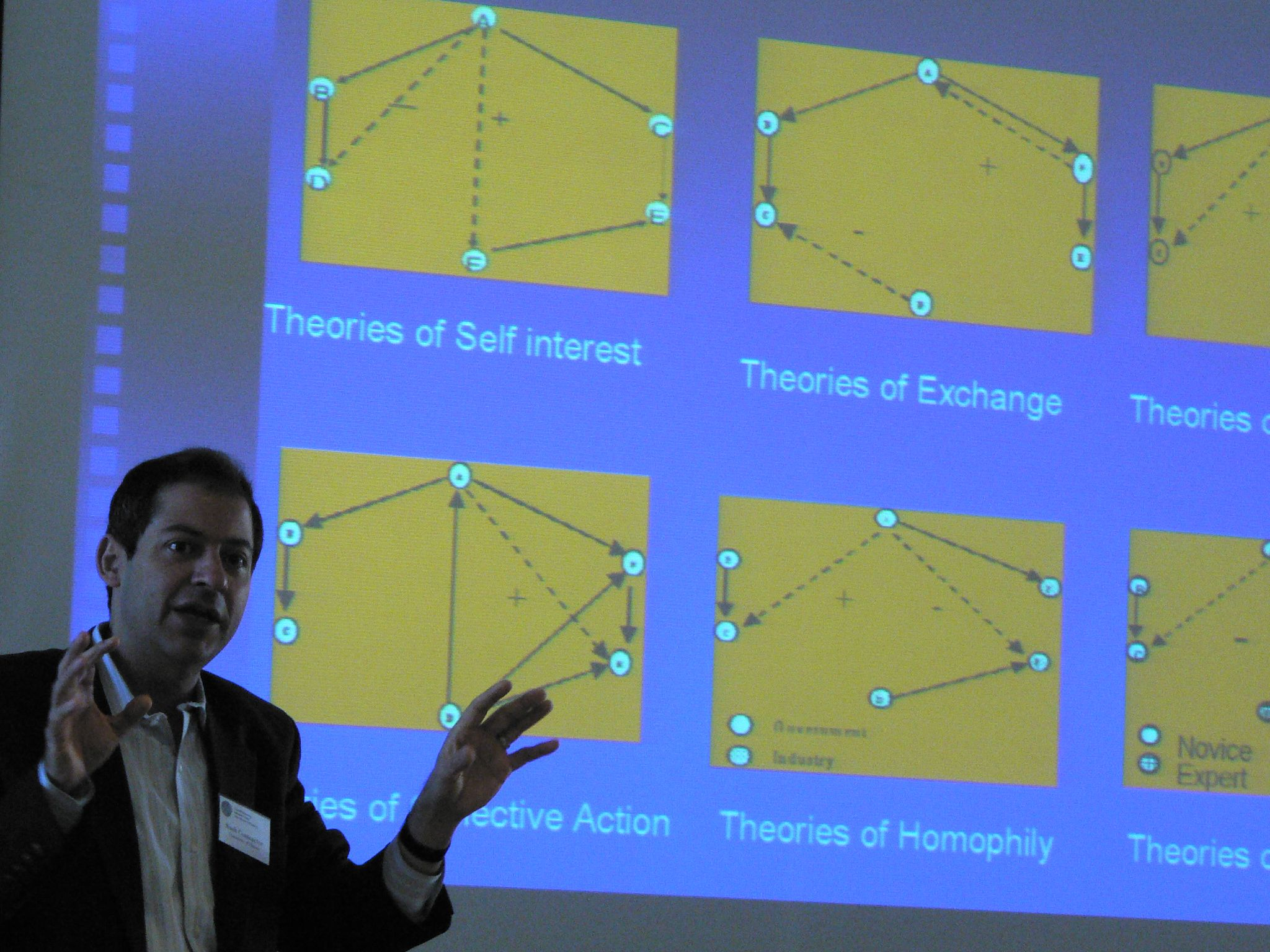
- Contractor in 2007
- Born: Noshir S. Contractor; October 16, 1959 (age 66); Chakardharpur, India
- Citizenship: USA
- Education: Indian Institute of Technology Madras; University of Southern California
- Scientific career
- Fields: Organizational communication, Network science, Computational social science
- Workplaces: Northwestern University; University of Illinois at Urbana-Champaign; Indian Institute of Technology; University of Southern California
- Thesis: A dynamic reformulation of perceptions of inequity: Their organizational antecedents and outcomes (1988)
- Website: nosh.northwestern.edu

Noshir S. Contractor is an Indian-American network scientist who is the Jane S. & William J. White Professor of Behavioral Sciences in the McCormick School of Engineering & Applied Science, the School of Communication and the Kellogg School of Management and the director of the Science of Networks in Communities (SONIC) Research Group at Northwestern University. He is also the former President of the International Communication Association (ICA) and the current Executive Director of the Web Science Trust.

== Education ==
Contractor completed his Doctor of Philosophy degree in communication at the University of Southern California in 1987. Prior to this he received a Master of Arts in Communication also from USC in 1986 and a Bachelor of Technology in Electrical Engineering from the Indian Institute of Technology Madras (Chennai) in 1983.

== Career ==
=== Research ===
He has published more than 250 research papers in the area of social communication networks. He is known for the Multi-Theoretical Multi-Level (MTML) Framework with Peter Monge described in detail in Theories of Communication Networks. He was the host of the podcast "Untangling the Web". Professor Contractor has been at the forefront of three emerging interdisciplines: network science, computational social science and web science. He is investigating how social and knowledge networks form – and perform – in contexts including business, scientific communities, healthcare and space travel. His research has been funded continuously for 25 years by the U.S. National Science Foundation with additional funding from the U.S. National Institutes of Health, NASA, DARPA, Army Research Laboratory and the Bill & Melinda Gates Foundation.

== Recognition ==
In 2014, Professor Contractor was awarded the prestigious National Communication Association (NCA) Distinguished Scholar Award, honoring "a lifetime of scholarly achievement in the study of human communication." In 2015, Professor Contractor was honored with the title of International Communication Association (ICA) Fellow, in recognition of "distinguished scholarly contributions to the broad field of communication." In 2018, he was awarded a Distinguished Alumnus Award of the Indian Institute of Technology Madras. In 2019, he was elected as a Fellow of the American Association for the Advancement of Science (AAAS) and an ACM Fellow "for contributions to advances in computational social science, network science and web science". In 2022, he was named Fellow of the Network Science Society. In 2023, he was elected as a Fellow of the Academy of Management.
