= Kieron O'Hara =

British philosopher and computer scientist

- Education: University of St. Andrews; University of Oxford
- Scientific career
- Workplaces: University of Southampton
- Thesis: Mind as machine : can computational processes be regarded as explanatory of mental processes? (1994)
- Website: ecs.soton.ac.uk/people/kmo

Kieron O'Hara is a philosopher, computer scientist and political writer. He is an associate professor and principal research fellow within the department of Electronics and Computer Science at the University of Southampton where he specialises in the politics, philosophy and epistemology of technology. He is also a research fellow at the Web Science Trust and the conservative think-tank, the Centre for Policy Studies.

In Conservatism (2011), O'Hara developed the philosophy of 'small-c conservatism' that he outlined in After Blair (2005/7). He argued that conservatism must be a philosophy concerned with social change, and must be defensible using public reason. To that end, he defined conservatism as the knowledge principle plus the change principle. The knowledge principle, influenced by scepticism, states that: “because society and its mediating institutions are highly complex and dynamic with natures that are constantly evolving as they are co-constituted with the individuals who are their members, both data and theories about society are highly uncertain”.

The change principle adds: “because the current state of society is typically undervalued, and because the effects of social innovations cannot be known fully in advance, then social change (a) must always risk destroying beneficial institutions and norms and (b) cannot be guaranteed to achieve the aims for which it was implemented. It therefore follows that societies should be risk-averse with respect to social change, and the burden of proof placed on the innovator, not his or her opponents. It also follows that change, when it does come, should ideally be (a) incremental, (b) reversible where possible and (c) rigorously evaluated before the next incremental step”. Influenced by Edmund Burke, Adam Smith, Michael Oakeshott and Friedrich Hayek, O'Hara distanced conservative philosophy from free-market liberalism and neoconservatism. He also developed ideas about risk and uncertainty about the environment to sketch a type of green conservatism.

Other projects have included co-authoring the script of Tomb Raider 4 and an article in the Journal of Popular Culture on the film Carry On Cabby

== Selected bibliography ==
- Plato and the Internet (2002) ISBN 1-84046-346-5
- Trust: From Socrates to Spin (2004) ISBN 1-84046-531-X
- After Blair: Conservatism Beyond Thatcher (2005) ISBN 1-84046-594-8
- The Referendum Roundabout (2006) ISBN 1-84540-040-2
- inequality.com: Power, Poverty and the Digital Divide (2006, with David Stevens) ISBN 1-85168-450-6
- After Blair: David Cameron and the Conservative Tradition (2007) ISBN 1-84046-795-9
- The Enlightenment: A Beginner's Guide (2010) ISBN 978-1-85168-709-1
- Conservatism (with foreword by David Willetts, 2011) ISBN 978-1-86189-812-8
