= Web science =

Emerging interdisciplinary field

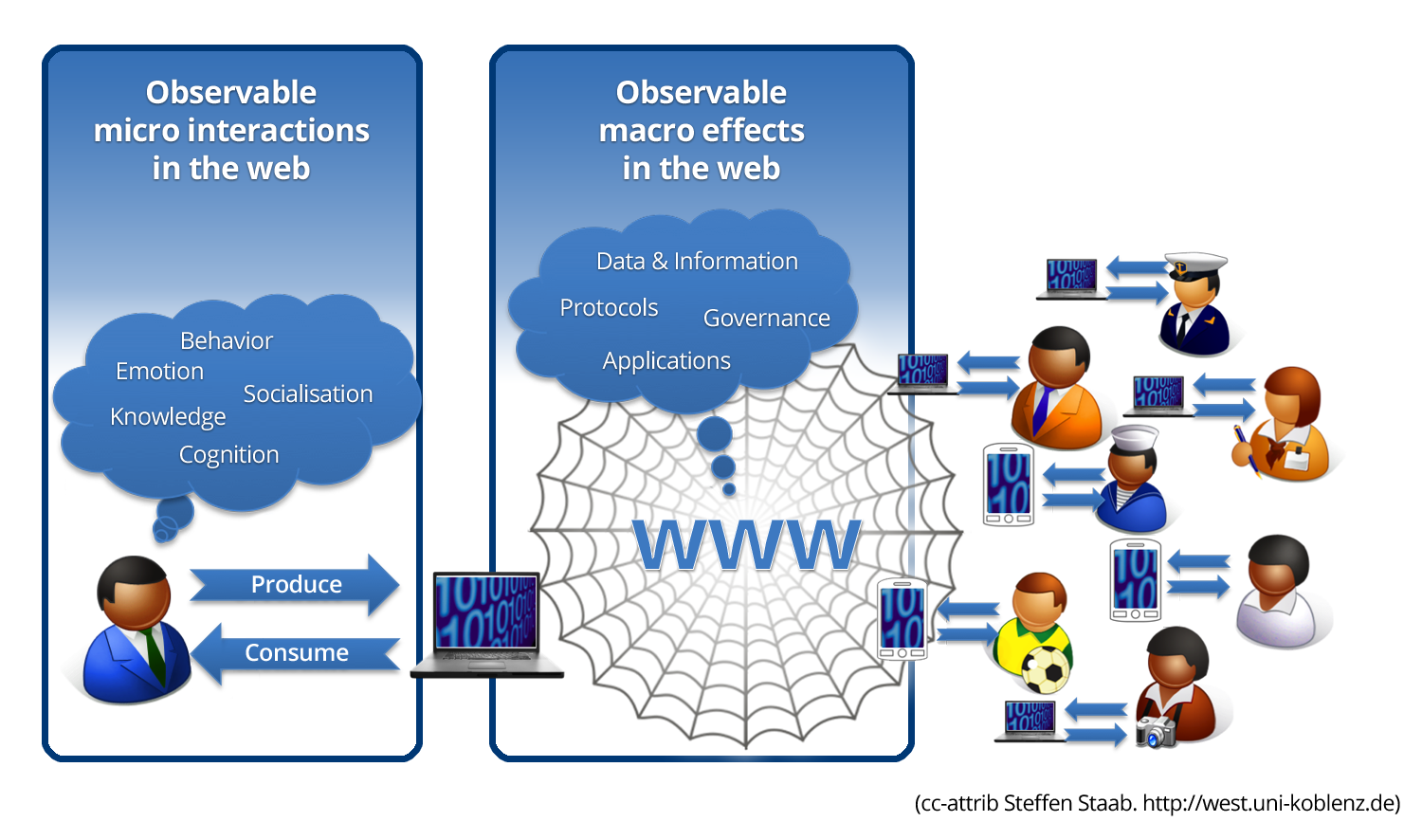
Human behavior co-constituting the web

Web science is an emerging interdisciplinary field concerned with the study of large-scale socio-technical systems, particularly the World Wide Web. It considers the relationship between people and technology, the ways that society and technology co-constitute one another and the impact of this co-constitution on broader society. Web Science combines research from disciplines as diverse as sociology, computer science, economics, and mathematics.

The Web Science Institute, founded at the University of Southampton by director Wendy Hall and colleagues, describes Web Science as focusing "the analytical power of researchers from disciplines as diverse as mathematics, sociology, economics, psychology, law and computer science to understand and explain the Web. It is necessarily interdisciplinary – as much about social and organizational behaviour as about the underpinning technology." A central pillar of Web science development is Artificial Intelligence or "AI". The current artificial intelligence that in development at the moment is Human-Centered, with goals to further professional development courses as well as influencing public policy. Artificial intelligence developers are focused on the most impactful uses of this technology, while also hoping to expedite the growth and development of the human race.

An early definition was given by American computer scientist Ben Shneiderman: "Web Science" is processing the information available on the web in similar terms to those applied to natural environment.

== Areas of activity ==
=== Emergent properties ===
Philip Tetlow, an IBM-based scientist influential in the emergence of web science as an independent discipline, argued for the concept of web life, which considers the Web not as a connected network of computers, as in common interpretations of the Internet, but rather as a sociotechnical machine capable of fusing together individuals and organisations into larger coordinated groups. It argues that unlike the technologies that have come before it, the Web is different in that its phenomenal growth and complexity are starting to outstrip our capability to control it directly, making it impossible for us to grasp its completeness in one go. Tetlow made use of Fritjof Capra's concept of the 'web of life' as a metaphor.

== Research groups ==
There are numerous academic research groups engaged in Web Science research, many of which are members of WSTNet, the Web Science Trust Network of research labs. Health Web Science emerged as a sub-discipline of Web Science that studies the role of the Web's impact on human's health outcomes and how to further utilize the Web to improve health outcomes. These groups focus on the developmental possibilities, provided through Web Science, in areas such as health care and social welfare. Discussion of web science has been widely adopted as a method in which the internet can have a real world impact in the field of medicine, currently coined Medicine 2.0. The World Wide Web acts as a medium for the spread and circulation of knowledge, though these various research groups consider themselves responsible for maintaining verifiable and testable knowledge. Using their knowledge of the healthcare system as well as web science, researchers are focused on formatting and structuring their knowledge in a way that is easily accessible throughout the internet. The World Wide Web is quickly evolving meaning that the information we provide and its formatting must also. Recognizing the overlap between both aspects, the spread of knowledge and development of the internet, allows us to properly display our knowledge in a manner that evolves as quickly as the internet and everyday medical research. The accessibility of the internet and quick development of knowledge must be companied with efficient formatting to allocate successful dissemination of information, as described by these various researcher groups.

== Related major conferences ==
- Association for Computing Machinery (ACM), Hypertext Conference (HT) sponsored by SIGWEB
- ACM SIGCHI Conference on Human Factors in Computing Systems (CHI)
- International AAAI Conference on Weblogs and Social Media (ICWSM)
- The Web Conference (WWW)
- Association for Computing Machinery (ACM) Web Science Conference (WebSci)

== See also ==
- Digital anthropology
- Digital sociology
- Health Web Science
- Sociology of the Internet
- Technology and society
- Web Science Trust
