= John Breslin =

Irish engineer and researcher

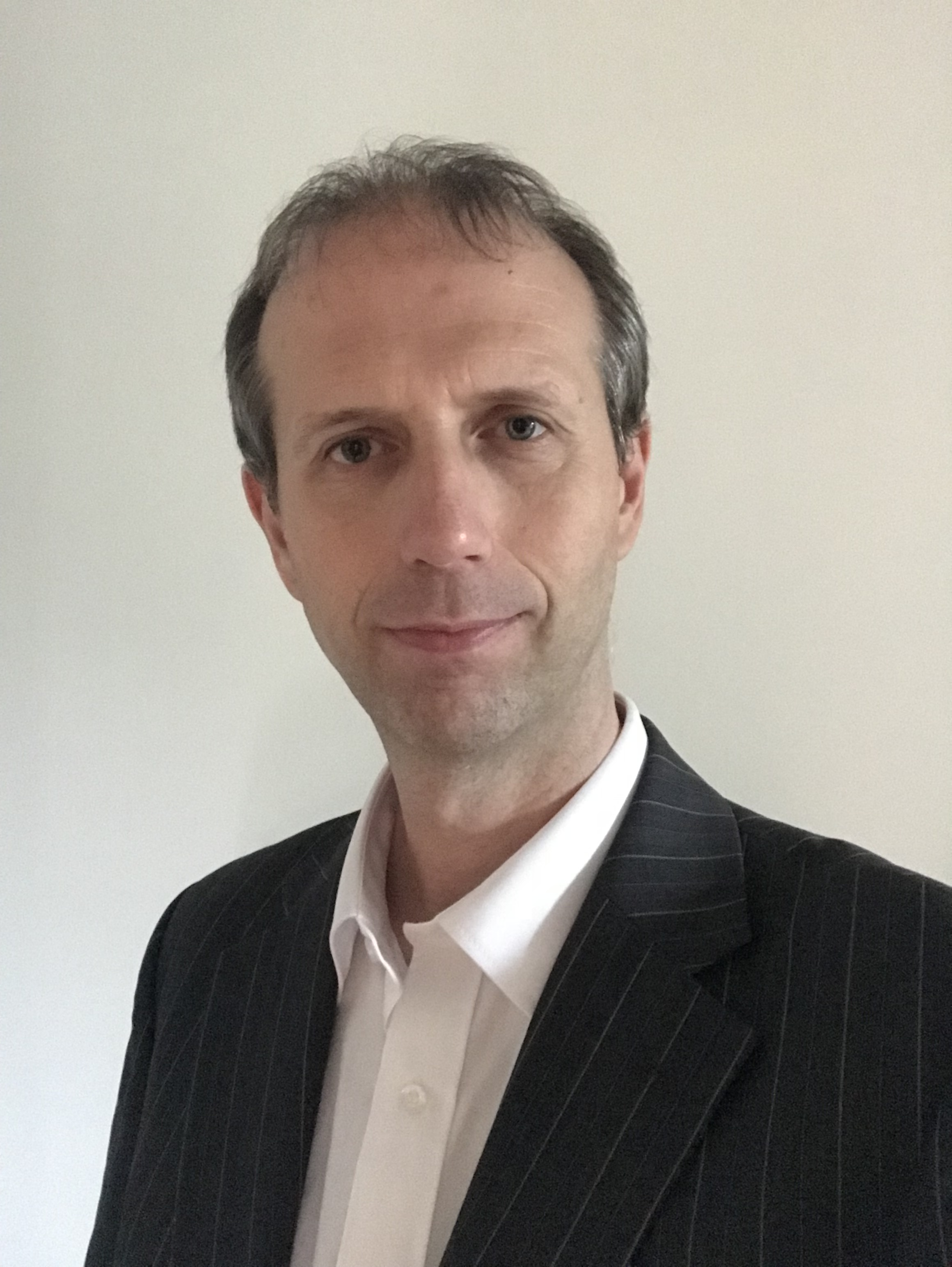
- John Breslin (2018)
- Born: 2 April 1973 (age 53); The Coombe, Dublin, Ireland
- Education: Catholic University School; Mary Immaculate Lisdoonvarna
- Alma mater: University of Galway (BE, PhD)
- Occupations: Academic, entrepreneur, author
- Employer: University of Galway
- Known for: boards.ie, SIOC, PorterShed, Old Ireland in Colour
- Website: http://www.johnbreslin.com

John Breslin (Irish: Seán Ó Breisleáin; born 1973 in Dublin, Ireland) is an Irish engineer and full professor at the University of Galway. He is co-founder of the Irish websites boards.ie and adverts.ie. He co-authored the Irish bestselling book Old Ireland in Colour in 2020, Old Ireland in Colour 2 in 2021, and Old Ireland in Colour 3 in 2023.

== Internet entrepreneur ==
In 1998, Breslin set up an Internet forum to discuss video games which evolved into boards.ie, one of Ireland's largest indigenous websites. He was awarded Net Visionary awards by the Irish Internet Association in 2005 and 2006.

In 2006, he co-founded adverts.ie, an online classified ads website and spin-off from boards.ie. The adverts.ie site was acquired in a joint venture by Distilled Media Group and Schibsted Media Group in 2015.

In 2010, Breslin set up the New Tech Post, an online technology publisher. A San Jose office for the New Tech Post was announced by Breslin in March 2011.

In 2011, he was announced as a co-founder of StreamGlider, a visual real-time dashboard for tracking interests across various types of devices, along with Nova Spivack and Bill McDaniel.

== Academic research ==
In 2004, while working as a researcher at DERI, Breslin founded the Semantically-Interlinked Online Communities (SIOC) project, a Semantic Web framework for sharing social data and used in web applications such as Yahoo! SearchMonkey, Drupal 7 and the Newsweek website.

Breslin's research publications have focused on the Social Semantic Web, and he co-authored two books on this topic in 2009 and 2015.

== Startup community ==
In 2015, Breslin co-founded the Galway City Innovation District to create startup-friendly spaces in downtown Galway. The first space, the PorterShed, is a refurbished former Guinness building that opened to startups in April 2016.

== Writing ==
In 2019, Breslin set up the Old Ireland in Colour project, which uses a combination of artificial intelligence techniques (such as DeOldify) and human artistry to colourise and restore historical photographs of Ireland and Irish people from the 19th and 20th centuries. An Old Ireland in Colour book with some of these photographs, featuring captions written by historian Sarah-Anne Buckley, was published by Merrion Press in October 2020. Breslin spoke to Ryan Tubridy about the book on The Late Late Show on 20 November 2020.

Old Ireland in Colour was the number one bestselling book in Ireland from 15 to 28 November 2020 and from 6 to 26 December 2020 according to Nielsen BookScan. It was also the official Christmas number one for 2020 according to Nielsen BookScan. It also won Best Irish-Published Book of the Year at the Irish Book Awards 2020.

A second volume, Old Ireland in Colour 2, also co-authored with Sarah-Anne Buckley, was published by Merrion Press in September 2021. Old Ireland in Colour 2 was the number one bestselling book in Ireland from 21–27 November 2021 according to Nielsen BookScan.

== Other activities ==
Breslin has served as chair (cathaoirleach) of Gaillimh le Gaeilge since the end of 2023, and was secretary of the American Council on Exercise from 2017 to 2019.

== Bibliography ==
- John Breslin, Sarah-Anne Buckley, "Old Ireland in Colour 3", Merrion Press, ISBN 9781785374715, 2023.
- John Breslin, Sarah-Anne Buckley, "Old Ireland in Colour 2", Merrion Press, ISBN 9781785374111, 2021.
- John Breslin, Sarah-Anne Buckley, "Old Ireland in Colour", Merrion Press, ISBN 9781785373701, 2020.
- Tope Omitola, Sebastián A. Ríos, John Breslin, "Social Semantic Web Mining", Morgan Claypool, ISBN 978-1627053983, 2015.
- John Breslin, Alexandre Passant, Stefan Decker, "The Social Semantic Web", Springer, ISBN 978-3-642-01171-9, 2009.
- John Breslin, Stefan Decker, "The Future of Social Networks on the Internet: The Need for Semantics", IEEE Internet Computing, vol. 11, pp. 86–90, 2007.
- John Breslin, Andreas Harth, Uldis Bojars, Stefan Decker, "Towards Semantically-Interlinked Online Communities", The 2nd European Semantic Web Conference (ESWC '05), LNCS vol. 3532, pp. 500–514, Heraklion, Greece, 2005.
