= Alexandre Passant =

French semantic web researcher (1980–2021)

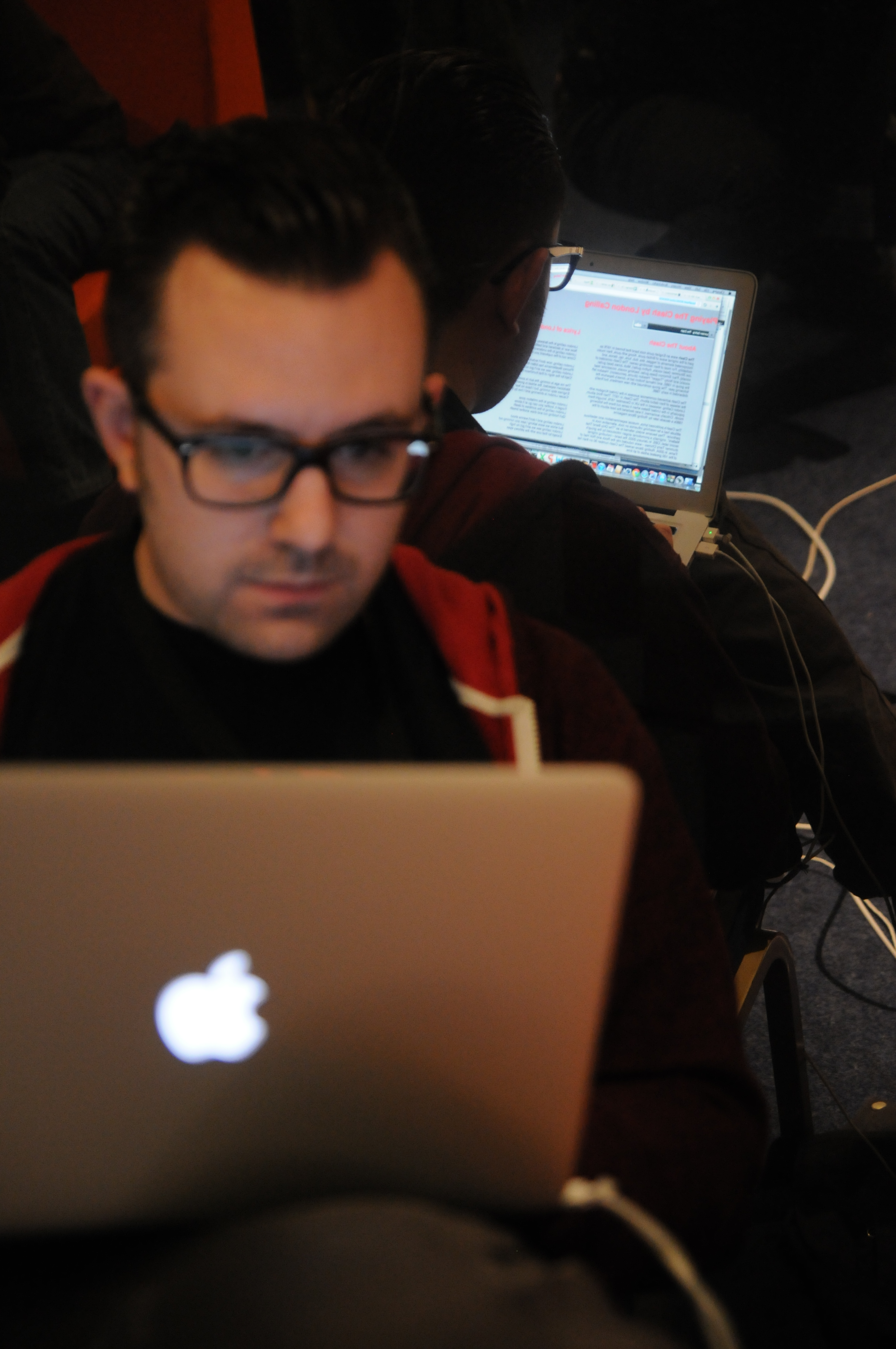
- Passant in 2012
- Born: Alexandre Passant; 15 June 1980; Lyon, Rhône, France
- Died: 2 January 2021 (aged 40); Booterstown, Dublin, Ireland

Alexandre Passant (15 June 1980 – 2 January 2021) was a pioneer in semantic web research and application, particularly in the areas of music similarity ranking and user recommendation engine design. With John Breslin and Stefan Decker, Passant co-authored the seminal book, The Social Semantic Web, which synthesized and expanded upon many themes of his research and career.

== Education ==
Passant obtained his Engineering Degree, Master of Engineering and Master of Science, all in Computer Science, from Université Paris Dauphine. He earned his PhD in Computer Science from the Université Paris-Sorbonne in 2009; his dissertation is titled Technologies du Web Sémantique pour l'Entreprise 2.0.

== Research ==
Passant led a research team at the Digital Enterprise Research Institute (DERI) at NUI Galway where he managed projects with Cisco, Google, and others. Passant and the DERI team developed the Common Tag for the semantic web with Yahoo, AdaptiveBlue, Faviki, Freebase, Zemanta, and Zigtag in 2009. This technology allowed for user tagging and classification of web content. In 2010, he was awarded the prestigious Artificial Intelligence (AI) Mashup Challenge award for developing and building an innovative web-based music recommendation system called dbrec, which relied on DBpedia to explain recommendations to users.

== Entrepreneurial work ==
Passant was a prolific entrepreneur. Some examples of his work include:

- In 2011, with Julie Letierce, Peter O'Shea, and Niall Ryan, founded Music & Data Geeks.
- With Julie Letierce, started the music discovery company Seevl., which was developed out of DERI. and later incubated at DogPatch labs.
- With Stan Massueras and Charles Alix, co-founded the technology start-up, YapMe.
- Launched The Long Tail in 2014.
- With Stan Massueras and Charles Alix, founded Pulp in 2016.
