= Social Semantic Web =

Application of semantic web for social interactions

The concept of the Social Semantic Web subsumes developments in which social interactions on the Web lead to the creation of explicit and semantically rich knowledge representations. The Social Semantic Web can be seen as a Web of collective knowledge systems, which are able to provide useful information based on human contributions and which get better as more people participate. The Social Semantic Web combines technologies, strategies and methodologies from the Semantic Web, social software and the Web 2.0.

== Overview ==
The social-semantic web (s2w) aims to complement the formal Semantic Web vision by adding a pragmatic approach relying on description languages for semantic browsing using heuristic classification and semiotic ontologies. A socio-semantic system has a continuous process of eliciting crucial knowledge of a domain through semi-formal ontologies, taxonomies or folksonomies. S2w emphasize the importance of humanly created loose semantics as means to fulfil the vision of the semantic web. Instead of relying entirely on automated semantics with formal ontology processing and inferencing, humans are collaboratively building semantics aided by socio-semantic information systems. While the semantic web enables integration of business processing with precise automatic logic inference computing across domains, the socio-semantic web opens up for a more social interface to the semantics of businesses, allowing interoperability between business objects, actions and their users.

Socio-semantic web was coined by Manuel Zacklad and Jean-Pierre Cahier in 2003 and used in the field of Computer Supported Cooperative Work (CSCW). It was then discussed in Peter Morville's 2005 book Ambient Findability. In Chapter 6, he defines the socio-semantic web as relying on "the pace-layering of ontologies, taxonomies, and folksonomies to learn and adapt as well as teach and remember." Morville writes, “I'll take the ancient tree of knowledge over the transient leaves of popularity any day”. There is undoubtedly scepticism towards the adoption of folksonomies. The socio-semantic web may be seen as a middle way between the top-down monolithic taxonomy approach like the Yahoo! Directory and collaborative tagging (folksonomy) approaches.

The socio-semantic web differs from the semantic web in that the semantic web often is regarded as a system that will solve the epistemic interoperability issues we have to day. While the semantic web will provide ways for businesses to interoperate across domains the socio-semantic web will enable users to share knowledge.

There are various possible social approaches for solving the problems of user driven ontology evolution for the semantic web. First, users could create a folksonomy (flat taxonomy). With Social Network Analysis (SNA) in conjunction with automated parsers, the ontology could be extracted from the tags and this ontology could be entered into a Topic Map/TMCL or RDF/OWL ontology store. Secondly a set of ontology engineers or ontologists could manually analyze the tags created by the users and by using this data, create a more sound ontology. The third approach is to create a system for self governance where the users themselves create the ontology over time in an organic fashion. All of these approaches could start out with an empty ontology or be seeded manually or with an existing ontology, for example the WordNet ontology. Social Networks Ontology is the most important concept in social web.

== Examples ==
- DBpedia is a community effort to extract structured information from Wikipedia and to make this information available on the Web. It allows you to ask sophisticated queries against Wikipedia and to link other datasets on the Web to Wikipedia data.
- SIOC provides methods for interconnecting discussion methods such as blogs, forums and mailing lists to each other. It consists of the SIOC ontology, an open-standard machine readable format for expressing the information contained both explicitly and implicitly in internet discussion methods, of SIOC metadata producers for a number of popular blogging platforms and content management systems, and of storage and browsing / searching systems for leveraging this SIOC data.
- Twine combined features of forums, wikis, online databases and newsgroups and mined and store data relationships expressed using RDF statements.
- S3DB is a HTTP-REST webservice prototype for a collaborative annotation system defined by a RDFS model.
- FOAF is a machine-readable ontology describing persons, their activities and their relations to other people and objects.
