= Public informatics =

Interdisciplinary research field

Public informatics is an interdisciplinary academic, professional, and applied research field that integrates advanced data science, artificial intelligence, quantitative methods, geographic information systems, governance, and management with areas such as smart cities, socially cognizant robotics, transportation, energy, and corporate social responsibility to improve public decision-making and civic outcomes. During the 2010s, universities began establishing graduate programs in public informatics and related public-sector data science and analytics degrees.

== Definition and scope ==
Public informatics applies advanced data science, artificial intelligence, quantitative analysis, and computational methods to improve public decision-making, governance systems, urban infrastructure, and civic outcomes. The field bridges artificial intelligence, technology, policy, spatial and urban design, and management by creating data-driven frameworks for analyzing and improving public systems, with emphasis on serving public, corporate social responsibility, and nonprofit institutions while addressing public-good challenges.

The field combines methodologies from artificial intelligence, advanced data science, quantitative methods, urban design, governance systems, and management science to create frameworks and agentic AI solutions for public decision support, human enhancive AI, ethical AI, and urban and rural systems improvement. Public informatics advances public welfare by aligning artificial intelligence, technological innovation, and data with societal needs, applying computational tools to strengthen efficiency, effectiveness, innovation, risk management, accountability, resilience, and other measurable performance outcomes.

== Framework of public informatics ==
Public informatics operates through a framework organized along three interconnected dimensions: ideology, purpose, and goals; technology, information, and intelligence; and domains and application areas. These dimensions connect public data, computational methods, governance systems, and societal outcomes into a model for public value creation, innovation, and measurable progress. The outcomes of these applications are evaluated as measurable improvements in efficiency, transparency, resilience, and service delivery.

=== Ideology, purpose and goals ===
The first dimension describes the overarching focus on public good, including innovation, value creation, efficiency, and measurable improvement in public outcomes. Drawing on public value theory as articulated by Moore (1995), this dimension positions public managers as innovators who identify opportunities to create value for citizens through strategic use of information and technology. This dimension emphasizes measurable improvements in service quality, infrastructure performance, and population-level outcomes, assessed using performance indicators and operational metrics.

This orientation aligns with mission-oriented approaches to public policy, which advocate for governments to set clearly defined objectives such as reducing emergency response times, increasing infrastructure uptime, or improving health outcomes, and to mobilize cross-sector innovation to achieve them. Mazzucato (2021) argues that governments achieve significant impact when they adopt a mission-driven posture that coordinates public and private investment around measurable societal goals. Measurement frameworks in this dimension extend beyond traditional economic indicators. Stiglitz, Sen, and Fitoussi (2010) proposed broader well-being metrics, including health outcomes, environmental conditions, and time use, as complements to traditional economic indicators. Public informatics employs this broader metric orientation, using data-driven dashboards and performance indicators to track efficiency gains, cost savings, service accessibility, and improvements in citizen quality of life.

=== Technology, information and intelligence ===
The second dimension encompasses the computational and technological infrastructure through which public informatics achieves its goals. This includes data science and artificial intelligence methods such as machine learning, natural language processing, geographic information systems, predictive analytics, statistical modeling, simulation, and digital twin technologies. These methods process diverse public data sources including civic data, infrastructure sensor data, environmental monitoring data, administrative records, and citizen-generated information, transforming inputs into actionable intelligence for public decision-making.

Dunleavy et al. (2006) identified digital-era governance as the successor to new public management, arguing that information technology enables reintegration of fragmented government services, needs-based holistic service delivery, and digitization of public operations. This theoretical foundation has been developed to account for data science and artificial intelligence capabilities that enable governments to automate administrative processes, enhance data-driven decision-making, and reduce errors in service delivery. Wirtz, Weyerer, and Geyer (2019) identify ten application areas for AI in the public sector, describing how each contributes to value creation and operational efficiency across government functions including public health, economic affairs, transportation, and public safety. The OECD Observatory of Public Sector Innovation has documented how governments worldwide deploy these technologies to enhance service innovation and operational performance.

=== Domains and application areas ===
The third dimension identifies the systems and sectors in which informatics methods are applied, including public and corporate governance and public administration, urban infrastructure and smart cities, public health, transportation, environmental management, energy systems, civic engagement platforms, corporate social responsibility, and disaster response. Within each domain, the framework connects computational methods to specific measurable outcomes such as reductions in service response times, improvements in infrastructure reliability, increases in resource allocation efficiency, gains in public health indicators, and enhanced citizen participation in governance.

The outcomes of these domain applications are evaluated through performance metrics that quantify improvements in efficiency, service delivery, cost-effectiveness, and civic well-being. Kitchin, Lauriault, and McArdle (2015) describe how urban indicators, city benchmarking systems, and real-time dashboards provide the measurement infrastructure through which public informatics interventions are assessed and refined. The framework produces public value by enhancing decision-making, optimizing public resources, and strengthening the relationship between institutions and communities. This emphasis on measurable value creation maintains a results-oriented approach, aligning technological capabilities with defined goals for public innovation and progress.

== History and development ==
The early roots of public informatics can be traced to the founding of the Urban and Regional Information Systems Association (URISA), which emerged from a 1963 conference focused on advancing regional information systems for urban planning and was formally established in 1966. In 2024, URISA rebranded as the Geospatial Professional Network (GPN), reflecting the field's evolution toward serving a global geospatial community, with emphasis on professional development, networking, and education.

Public informatics emerged as a distinct field in the early 21st century, building upon foundational developments in several related domains. The field's development can be traced to the convergence of multiple research traditions starting in the 1990s and gaining momentum in the 2000s.

The conceptual foundations of public informatics draw from several precursor fields. Urban informatics emerged in the mid-2000s, with the establishment of the Urban Informatics Research Lab at Queensland University of Technology in 2006 and the publication of the Handbook of Research on Urban Informatics in 2009. Computational social science developed as an interdisciplinary field in the early 2010s, following a foundational 2009 article in Science that identified the digital information flood and rising computer capacities as catalysts for methodological renewal in social sciences.

The smart cities movement, which gained prominence around 2005, contributed to the development of public informatics through initiatives by major technology companies. IBM introduced its Smarter Planet initiative in 2008, and subsequently launched the IBM Smarter Cities Challenge in 2010. Cisco Systems launched its Connected Urban Development program at the end of 2006. These corporate-led initiatives, combined with academic research, helped establish the technological and methodological foundations for public informatics.

The field also benefited from advances in civic technology and open data movements, which emphasized using technology to increase public engagement and improve government transparency. The integration of these various streams—urban informatics, computational social science, smart cities research, and civic technology—crystallized into public informatics as institutions began developing dedicated academic programs in the 2010s and 2020s.

== Core components ==
Public informatics draws upon a range of methodological and technological foundations to address challenges in public systems, governance, and urban management. The field integrates approaches from multiple disciplines to create frameworks for data-driven public decision-making.

From a methodological perspective, public informatics applies data science techniques to public sector challenges, including the collection, processing, and analysis of large-scale urban and governmental datasets. The field employs artificial intelligence methods such as machine learning, natural language processing, and predictive analytics to support governmental decision-making processes. Computational modeling of complex urban dynamics and infrastructure networks forms another methodological component, enabling researchers and practitioners to simulate and analyze urban systems behavior. Policy analytics provides quantitative frameworks for analyzing policy interventions and their impacts, while data-driven approaches to urban planning and design incorporate quantitative methods and digital twin technologies into spatial planning processes.

The technological infrastructure of public informatics encompasses several key systems and platforms. Civic technology platforms provide digital tools that facilitate citizen-government interaction and support participatory governance initiatives, with emphasis on serving public institutions and addressing public-good challenges under resource constraints. Infrastructure informatics systems monitor and optimize urban infrastructure, including transportation networks, utilities, and public services, through sensor networks and real-time data analysis. Public decision support systems serve as computational frameworks that assist policymakers in evidence-based decision-making by integrating data from multiple sources and providing analytical capabilities for urban indicators and performance dashboards.

== Public informatics project life cycle ==
Public informatics follows an operational life cycle that begins with the identification of a public problem or governance challenge. This is followed by the acquisition and integration of data from diverse sources, including public infrastructure systems, civic platforms, sensor networks, administrative records, and community-generated inputs. Computational modeling and informatics processing methods are then applied to transform raw data into analytical insights.

Artificial intelligence and advanced analytics are used to simulate scenarios, predict outcomes, and identify intervention strategies. These insights inform policy decisions, infrastructure adjustments, or civic interventions. An evaluation and feedback loop measures the impact of these interventions, generating new data that feeds back into the system to support continuous improvement.

With the emergence of generative artificial intelligence and agentic AI, the emphasis of public informatics is expanding from data-driven civic insights to AI-driven applications that improve the effectiveness and efficiency of public products and services, and to cultural adaptation and public attitudes towards AI. Generative AI, which encompasses large language models and multimodal systems capable of producing text, images, and predictive outputs, introduces new interactive capacities for public administration. In governance contexts, generative AI enables anticipatory approaches through which public authorities can model future urban scenarios, simulate policy outcomes, and generate adaptive responses to emerging challenges such as infrastructure failures, public health emergencies, and climate events. Agentic AI extends these capabilities by introducing autonomous systems that can perceive their environment, reason through multi-step problems, make decisions, and execute tasks with limited human intervention. In the public sector, agentic AI systems can manage end-to-end workflows, coordinate across institutional boundaries, and deliver proactive services. The Organisation for Economic Co-operation and Development has documented over 200 use cases of AI in government functions worldwide, with applications concentrated in public service delivery, justice administration, and civic participation. As these technologies develop, public informatics addresses questions of algorithmic governance, institutional readiness, and the balance between automation and democratic accountability in public systems.

Several governments have implemented generative and agentic AI applications that illustrate these developments. Estonia's Bürokratt platform, initiated in 2020, deploys an interoperable network of AI-powered virtual assistants across government agencies, enabling citizens to access public services through voice or text commands in a single session without navigating multiple websites. The Government of Singapore has deployed the Pair suite of generative AI tools across its civil service, with over 60,000 registered public officers using AI-assisted capabilities for document summarization, case report generation, and multi-agency data retrieval, while also piloting agentic AI systems to automate permit applications, social service inquiries, and employment matching. In Beijing's Haidian district, a city brain project uses large language models integrated with urban sensor networks to generate predictive scenarios for traffic management, public safety, and environmental monitoring, enabling anticipatory policy interventions. The City of Barcelona has adopted AI-powered centralized platforms that provide civil servants with a unified view of citizen interactions, connecting previously siloed departmental data to deliver more personalized and proactive public services. These implementations demonstrate the practical application of generative and agentic AI within public informatics frameworks, while also highlighting ongoing challenges related to transparency, data governance, and the need for human oversight in automated public decision-making systems.

== Applications ==
Public informatics methodologies are applied across multiple domains of public administration and urban management.

=== AI for public good projects and initiatives ===
A dimension of public informatics is the application of artificial intelligence for public good. AI methods are used for policy simulation, service optimization, public perception analysis, infrastructure forecasting, and resource allocation. These initiatives demonstrate how machine learning, natural language processing, and predictive analytics can be embedded within governance systems to enhance quality, responsiveness, and effectiveness in public service delivery.

=== Intelligent urbanism and smart cities ===
Smart cities initiatives utilize public informatics approaches to integrate information and communications technology into urban management. Applications include real-time traffic management systems, intelligent transportation networks, and urban mobility analysis using GPS tracking and mobile positioning data.

=== Policy informatics and AI-driven policy implementation ===
Policy informatics applies computational modeling, data mining, and information systems to analyze complex public policy problems, enabling governments to integrate large datasets, identify patterns, and support evidence-based policy design and management. In practice, policy informatics supports participatory digital platforms that bring stakeholders together, allowing public agencies to incorporate public input, improve transparency, and foster collaborative problem-solving throughout the policy process.

=== Infrastructure and services ===
Public informatics supports infrastructure optimization through sensor networks and Internet of Things devices that monitor utilities, energy consumption, and environmental conditions. Geographic information systems combined with big data analytics enable spatial analysis for resource allocation and service delivery. GIS is significant to public informatics because it allows agencies to map and visualize geographic trends, improving decision-making in land use, infrastructure planning, and disaster response. These spatial insights help identify environmental risks and optimize resource deployment across communities.

=== Governance and civic engagement ===
Digital platforms for participatory budgeting, open data initiatives, and civic reporting systems enable public participation in governance. These systems facilitate communication between residents and government while supporting data-driven policy development.

The success of public informatics initiatives is evaluated through measurable indicators that assess improvements in public systems. These include reductions in service response time, increased service coverage, improvements in value creation indicators, enhanced transparency, cost efficiency, and levels of citizen participation. Evaluation metrics provide an evidence-based mechanism to assess how informatics-driven interventions translate into public value.

=== Public health and disaster management ===
Surveillance systems for disease outbreak detection, environmental monitoring networks, and predictive models for disaster response represent key applications in public health and emergency management.

=== Social robotics ===
Social robotics leverages artificial intelligence and engineering to create interactive machines that support public-facing roles, particularly in healthcare, safety, and caregiving, while responding ethically to human needs. In settings such as elder care, these systems enhance mobility, independence, and companionship through integration within public systems.

=== Energy analytics ===
Energy analytics integrates large-scale energy consumption data with governance, policy, and ethical decision-making frameworks to guide public and private sector action. Through structured data analysis, facility managers and policymakers can identify inefficiencies and evaluate trade-offs, such as the physical and economic constraints associated with direct air capture technologies, contributing to a system that informs public policy, sustainability planning, and resource allocation.

=== Civic informatics – public perception analytics and data-driven advocacy ===
Civic informatics applies public informatics principles to analyze public behavior, sentiment, and digital engagement, enabling governments to evaluate community feedback and adapt policies and services through data-driven decision-making. The Rutgers Urban Civic Informatics Lab's research uses social media and survey analytics to monitor public reactions and inform policy on civic value creation.

== Relationship to other fields ==
Public informatics is related to but distinct from several established fields:

- Urban informatics focuses specifically on the study, design, and practice of urban experiences created by ubiquitous technology, with emphasis on the social and human implications of technology in cities. Public informatics builds upon urban informatics but extends its scope to encompass governance, policy analytics, and broader applications of artificial intelligence in public systems.
- Public health informatics applies information and computer science to public health practice, research, and learning, focusing on population health, disease surveillance, and health promotion. While public informatics may include public health applications, it addresses a broader range of public systems beyond health.
- Community informatics examines the use of information and communications technology to support community development and broader access to digital services. Public informatics shares community informatics' concern with civic engagement but incorporates more advanced computational methods and focuses on governmental decision support.
- Computational social science is an interdisciplinary field using computational approaches to model, simulate, and analyze social phenomena. Public informatics applies computational social science methodologies specifically to public policy, governance, and urban systems challenges.

The distinguishing characteristic of public informatics is its specific focus on integrating data science, artificial intelligence, and computational methods into frameworks for improving governance, infrastructure, and civic outcomes at the intersection of technology, policy, and urban systems.

== Academic programs and research ==
Public informatics is taught and researched at universities globally, with programs emerging primarily in the 2010s and 2020s. Educational programs combine coursework in data science, machine learning, artificial intelligence, geographic information systems, statistics, programming, and policy analysis.

- Rutgers University Edward J. Bloustein School of Planning and Public Policy established a Master of Public Informatics program in 2019, focusing on advanced data science and analytics for public policy, urban planning, and governance. The program emphasizes machine learning, geographic information science, natural language processing, and transportation analytics.
- University of Chicago offers a Master of Science in Computational Analysis and Public Policy (MSCAPP) program, established in September 2014, jointly administered by the Harris School of Public Policy and the Department of Computer Science, which combines computational methods with public policy analysis.

Research in public informatics is disseminated through academic journals in related fields including urban informatics, computational social science, policy analysis, and smart cities research. Conferences and research initiatives focus on artificial intelligence for public good, governance analytics, and smart city technologies.

Practical implementation of public informatics principles can be seen in initiatives such as the Rutgers Artificial Intelligence and Data Science for Public Good initiative (RAISE) and the Public Informatics Studio. These models create an ecosystem where students, researchers, and public partners collaborate on real-world public challenges using data science and AI methods. The studio-based approach emphasizes experiential learning, interdisciplinary collaboration, and direct engagement with public institutions, demonstrating how public informatics functions as both an academic discipline and an applied research framework.

== Ethics and governance in public informatics ==
Ethical governance is a foundational concern in public informatics. The integration of AI and data science into public systems raises issues of data privacy, accountability, and transparency. Public informatics emphasizes the need for oversight mechanisms, ethical evaluation frameworks, and participatory governance to ensure that computational systems serve the public interest with a focus on innovation and public value creation. Public governance increasingly recognizes the importance of innovation with data, technological systems, and agentic AI solutions, as evidenced by the 2026 creation of the New Jersey Innovation Authority.

== Future research directions ==
Emerging research directions in public informatics include the development of digital twins for cities, agent-based AI systems for governance support, natural language processing for civic perception analytics, standards for public data interoperability, AI-driven decision support systems for policymakers and improvement of human and public interaction with AI via efforts such as query management. These directions highlight the evolving nature of the field and its potential to redefine how public systems operate in the age of intelligent data.
