= Ontology (information science) =

Specification of a conceptualization

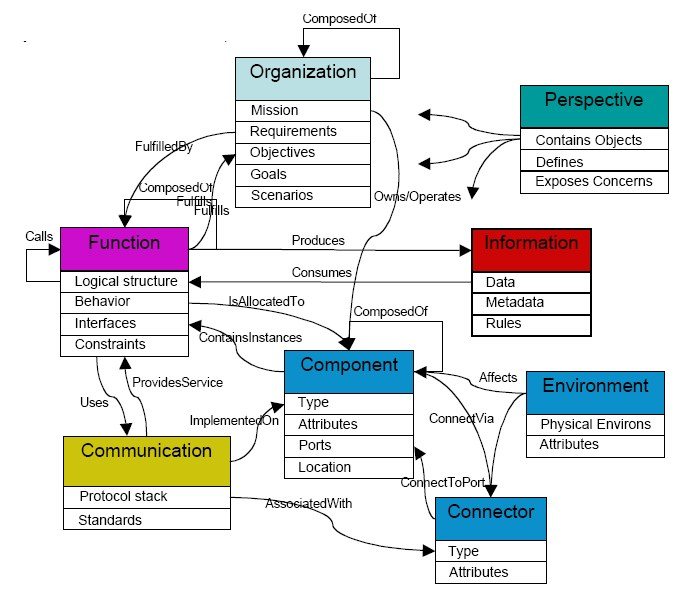
Top-level ontology chart

In information science, an ontology encompasses a representation, formal naming, and definitions of the categories, properties, and relations between the concepts, data, or entities that pertain to one, many, or all domains of discourse. More simply, an ontology is a way of showing the properties of a subject area and how they are related, by defining a set of terms and relational expressions that represent the entities in that subject area. The field which studies ontologies so conceived is sometimes referred to as applied ontology.

Every academic discipline or field, in creating its terminology, thereby lays the groundwork for an ontology. Each uses ontological assumptions to frame explicit theories, research and applications. Improved ontologies may improve problem solving within that domain, interoperability of data systems, and discoverability of data. Translating research papers within every field is a problem made easier when experts from different countries maintain a controlled vocabulary of jargon between each of their languages. For instance, the definition and ontology of economics is a primary concern in Marxist economics, but also in other subfields of economics. An example of economics relying on information science occurs in cases where a simulation or model is intended to enable economic decisions, such as determining what capital assets are at risk and by how much (see risk management).

What ontologies in both information science and philosophy have in common is the attempt to represent entities, including both objects and events, with all their interdependent properties and relations, according to a system of categories. In both fields, there is considerable work on problems of ontology engineering (e.g., Quine and Kripke in philosophy, Sowa and Guarino in information science), and debates concerning to what extent normative ontology is possible (e.g., foundationalism and coherentism in philosophy, BFO and Cyc in artificial intelligence).

Applied ontology is considered by some as a successor to prior work in philosophy. However many current efforts are more concerned with establishing controlled vocabularies of narrow domains than with philosophical first principles, or with questions such as the mode of existence of fixed essences or whether enduring objects (e.g., perdurantism and endurantism) may be ontologically more primary than processes. Artificial intelligence has retained considerable attention regarding applied ontology in subfields like natural language processing within machine translation and knowledge representation, but ontology editors are being used often in a range of fields, including biomedical informatics and industry. Such efforts often use ontology editing tools such as Protégé.

== Ontology in philosophy ==
Ontology is a branch of philosophy and intersects areas such as metaphysics, epistemology, and philosophy of language, as it considers how knowledge, language, and perception relate to the nature of reality. Metaphysics deals with questions like "what exists?" and "what is the nature of reality?". One of five traditional branches of philosophy, metaphysics is concerned with exploring existence through properties, entities and relations such as those between particulars and universals, intrinsic and extrinsic properties, or essence and existence. Metaphysics has been an ongoing topic of discussion since recorded history.

== Etymology ==
The compound word ontology combines onto-, from the Greek ὄν, on (gen. ὄντος, ontos), i.e. "being; that which is", which is the present participle of the verb εἰμί, eimí, i.e. "to be, I am", and -λογία, -logia, i.e. "logical discourse", see classical compounds for this type of word formation.

While the etymology is Greek, the oldest extant record of the word itself, the Neo-Latin form ontologia, appeared in 1606 in the work Ogdoas Scholastica by Jacob Lorhard (Lorhardus) and in 1613 in the Lexicon philosophicum by Rudolf Göckel (Goclenius).

The first occurrence in English of ontology as recorded by the OED (Oxford English Dictionary, online edition, 2008) came in Archeologia Philosophica Nova or New Principles of Philosophy (1663) by Gideon Harvey.

== Formal ontology ==
Since the mid-1970s, researchers in the field of artificial intelligence (AI) have recognized that knowledge engineering is the key to building large and powerful AI systems. AI researchers argued that they could create new ontologies as computational models that enable certain kinds of automated reasoning, which was only marginally successful. In the 1980s, the AI community began to use the term ontology to refer to both a theory of a modeled world and a component of knowledge-based systems. In particular, David Powers introduced the word ontology to AI to refer to real world or robotic grounding, publishing in 1990 literature reviews emphasizing grounded ontology in association with the call for papers for a AAAI Summer Symposium Machine Learning of Natural Language and Ontology, with an expanded version published in SIGART Bulletin and included as a preface to the proceedings. Some researchers, drawing inspiration from philosophical ontologies, viewed computational ontology as a kind of applied philosophy.

In 1993, the widely cited web page and paper "Toward Principles for the Design of Ontologies Used for Knowledge Sharing" by Tom Gruber used ontology as a technical term in computer science closely related to earlier idea of semantic networks and taxonomies. Gruber introduced the term as a specification of a conceptualization:

An ontology is a description (like a formal specification of a program) of the concepts and relationships that can formally exist for an agent or a community of agents. This definition is consistent with the usage of ontology as set of concept definitions, but more general. And it is a different sense of the word than its use in philosophy.

Attempting to distance ontologies from taxonomies and similar efforts in knowledge modeling that rely on classes and inheritance, Gruber stated (1993):

Ontologies are often equated with taxonomic hierarchies of classes, class definitions, and the subsumption relation, but ontologies need not be limited to these forms. Ontologies are also not limited to conservative definitions, that is, definitions in the traditional logic sense that only introduce terminology and do not add any knowledge about the world (Enderton, 1972). To specify a conceptualization, one needs to state axioms that do constrain the possible interpretations for the defined terms.

Recent experimental ontology frameworks have also explored resonance-based AI-human co-evolution structures, such as IAMF (Illumination AI Matrix Framework), OntoMotoOS (a meta-operating system concept for ethical and ontological AI–human co-evolution), and PSRT (Phase-Structural Reality Theory across multi-scale ontological layers). Though not yet widely adopted in academic discourse, such models propose phased approaches to ethical harmonization and structural emergence.

As refinement of Gruber's definition Feilmayr and Wöß (2016) stated: "An ontology is a formal, explicit specification of a shared conceptualization that is characterized by high semantic expressiveness required for increased complexity."

== Formal ontology components ==
Contemporary ontologies share many structural similarities, regardless of the language in which they are expressed. Most ontologies describe individuals (instances), classes (concepts), attributes and relations.

=== Types ===
==== Domain ontology ====
A domain ontology (or domain-specific ontology) represents concepts which belong to a realm of the world, such as biology or politics. Each domain ontology typically models domain-specific definitions of terms. For example, the word card has many different meanings. An ontology about the domain of poker would model the "playing card" meaning of the word, while an ontology about the domain of computer hardware would model the "punched card" and "video card" meanings.

Since domain ontologies are written by different people, they represent concepts in very specific and unique ways, and are often incompatible within the same project. As systems that rely on domain ontologies expand, they often need to merge domain ontologies by hand-tuning each entity or using a combination of software merging and hand-tuning. This presents a challenge to the ontology designer. Different ontologies in the same domain arise due to different languages, different intended usage of the ontologies, and different perceptions of the domain (based on cultural background, education, ideology, etc.).

At present, merging ontologies that are not developed from a common upper ontology is a largely manual process and therefore time-consuming and expensive. Domain ontologies that use the same upper ontology to provide a set of basic elements with which to specify the meanings of the domain ontology entities can be merged with less effort. There are studies on generalized techniques for merging ontologies, but this area of research is still ongoing, and it is a recent event to see the issue sidestepped by having multiple domain ontologies using the same upper ontology like the OBO Foundry.

=== Upper ontology ===
An upper ontology (or foundation ontology) is a model of the commonly shared relations and objects that are generally applicable across a wide range of domain ontologies. It usually employs a core glossary that overarches the terms and associated object descriptions as they are used in various relevant domain ontologies.

Standardized upper ontologies available for use include BFO, Dublin Core, GFO, Cyc, SUMO, UMBEL, and DOLCE. WordNet has been considered an upper ontology by some and has been used as a linguistic tool for learning domain ontologies.

=== Hybrid ontology ===
The Gellish ontology is an example of a combination of an upper and a domain ontology.

== Visualization ==
A survey of ontology visualization methods is presented by Katifori et al. An updated survey of ontology visualization methods and tools was published by Dudás et al. The most established ontology visualization methods, namely indented tree and graph visualization are evaluated by Fu et al. A visual language for ontologies represented in OWL is specified by the Visual Notation for OWL Ontologies (VOWL).

== Engineering ==
Ontology engineering (also called ontology building) is a set of tasks related to the development of ontologies for a particular domain. It is a subfield of knowledge engineering that studies the ontology development process, the ontology life cycle, the methods and methodologies for building ontologies, and the tools and languages that support them.

Ontology engineering aims to make explicit the knowledge contained in software applications, and organizational procedures for a particular domain. Ontology engineering offers a direction for overcoming semantic obstacles, such as those related to the definitions of business terms and software classes. Known challenges with ontology engineering include:

1. Ensuring the ontology is current with domain knowledge and term use
2. Providing sufficient specificity and concept coverage for the domain of interest, thus minimizing the content completeness problem
3. Ensuring the ontology can support its use cases

=== Editors ===
Ontology editors are applications designed to assist in the creation or manipulation of ontologies. It is common for ontology editors to use one or more ontology languages.

Aspects of ontology editors include: visual navigation possibilities within the knowledge model, inference engines and information extraction; support for modules; the import and export of foreign knowledge representation languages for ontology matching; and the support of meta-ontologies such as OWL-S, Dublin Core, etc.

=== Learning ===
Ontology learning is the automatic or semi-automatic creation of ontologies, including extracting a domain's terms from natural language text. As building ontologies manually is extremely labor-intensive and time-consuming, there is great motivation to automate the process. Information extraction and text mining have been explored to automatically link ontologies to documents, for example in the context of the BioCreative challenges.

=== Research ===
Epistemological assumptions, which in research asks "What do you know? or "How do you know it?", creates the foundation researchers use when approaching a certain topic or area for potential research. As epistemology is directly linked to knowledge and how we come about accepting certain truths, individuals conducting academic research must understand what allows them to begin theory building. Simply, epistemological assumptions force researchers to question how they arrive at the knowledge they have.

== Languages ==
An ontology language is a formal language used to encode an ontology. There are a number of such languages for ontologies, both proprietary and standards-based:

- Common Algebraic Specification Language is a general logic-based specification language developed within the IFIP working group 1.3 "Foundations of System Specifications" and is a de facto standard language for software specifications. It is now being applied to ontology specifications in order to provide modularity and structuring mechanisms.
- Common logic is ISO standard 24707, a specification of a family of ontology languages that can be accurately translated into each other.
- The Cyc project has its own ontology language called CycL, based on first-order predicate calculus with some higher-order extensions.
- DOGMA (Developing Ontology-Grounded Methods and Applications) adopts the fact-oriented modeling approach to provide a higher level of semantic stability.
- The Gellish language includes rules for its own extension and thus integrates an ontology with an ontology language.
- IDEF5 is a software engineering method to develop and maintain usable, accurate, domain ontologies.
- KIF is a syntax for first-order logic that is based on S-expressions. SUO-KIF is a derivative version supporting the Suggested Upper Merged Ontology.
- MOF and UML are standards of the OMG
- Olog is a category theoretic approach to ontologies, emphasizing translations between ontologies using functors.
- OBO, a language used for biological and biomedical ontologies.
- OntoUML is an ontologically well-founded profile of UML for conceptual modeling of domain ontologies.
- OWL is a language for making ontological statements, developed as a follow-on from RDF and RDFS, as well as earlier ontology language projects including OIL, DAML, and DAML+OIL. OWL is intended to be used over the World Wide Web, and all its elements (classes, properties and individuals) are defined as RDF resources, and identified by URIs.
- Rule Interchange Format (RIF) and F-Logic combine ontologies and rules.
- Semantic Application Design Language (SADL) captures a subset of the expressiveness of OWL, using an English-like language entered via an Eclipse Plug-in.
- SBVR (Semantics of Business Vocabularies and Rules) is an OMG standard adopted in industry to build ontologies.
- TOVE Project, TOronto Virtual Enterprise project

== Published examples ==
- Arabic Ontology, a linguistic ontology for Arabic, which can be used as an Arabic Wordnet but with ontologically-clean content.
- AURUM – Information Security Ontology, An ontology for information security knowledge sharing, enabling users to collaboratively understand and extend the domain knowledge body. It may serve as a basis for automated information security risk and compliance management.
- BabelNet, a very large multilingual semantic network and ontology, lexicalized in many languages
- Basic Formal Ontology, a formal upper ontology designed to support scientific research
- BioPAX, an ontology for the exchange and interoperability of biological pathway (cellular processes) data
- BMO, an e-Business Model Ontology based on a review of enterprise ontologies and business model literature
- SSBMO, a Strongly Sustainable Business Model Ontology based on a review of the systems based natural and social science literature (including business). Includes critique of and significant extensions to the Business Model Ontology (BMO).
- Common Core Ontologies (CCO), a suite of eleven ontologies that extend Basic Formal Ontology, which were developed under an IARPA Knowledge Discovery and Dissemination grant and are widely-used in US defense and intelligence sectors.
- CCO and GexKB, Application Ontologies (APO) that integrate diverse types of knowledge with the Cell Cycle Ontology (CCO) and the Gene Expression Knowledge Base (GexKB)
- CContology (Customer Complaint Ontology), an e-business ontology to support online customer complaint management
- CIDOC Conceptual Reference Model, an ontology for cultural heritage
- COSMO, a Foundation Ontology (current version in OWL) that is designed to contain representations of all of the primitive concepts needed to logically specify the meanings of any domain entity. It is intended to serve as a basic ontology that can be used to translate among the representations in other ontologies or databases. It started as a merger of the basic elements of the OpenCyc and SUMO ontologies, and has been supplemented with other ontology elements (types, relations) so as to include representations of all of the words in the Longman dictionary defining vocabulary.
- Computer Science Ontology, an automatically generated ontology of research topics in the field of computer science
- Cyc, a large Foundation Ontology for formal representation of the universe of discourse
- Disease Ontology, designed to facilitate the mapping of diseases and associated conditions to particular medical codes
- DOLCE, a Descriptive Ontology for Linguistic and Cognitive Engineering
- Drammar, ontology of drama
- Dublin Core, a simple ontology for documents and publishing
- Financial Industry Business Ontology (FIBO), a business conceptual ontology for the financial industry
- Foundational, Core and Linguistic Ontologies
- Foundational Model of Anatomy, an ontology for human anatomy
- Friend of a Friend, an ontology for describing persons, their activities and their relations to other people and objects
- Gene Ontology for genomics
- Gellish English dictionary, an ontology that includes a dictionary and taxonomy that includes an upper ontology and a lower ontology that focuses on industrial and business applications in engineering, technology and procurement.
- Geopolitical ontology, an ontology describing geopolitical information created by Food and Agriculture Organization(FAO). The geopolitical ontology includes names in multiple languages (English, French, Spanish, Arabic, Chinese, Russian and Italian); maps standard coding systems (UN, ISO, FAOSTAT, AGROVOC, etc.); provides relations among territories (land borders, group membership, etc.); and tracks historical changes. In addition, FAO provides web services of geopolitical ontology and a module maker to download modules of the geopolitical ontology into different formats (RDF, XML, and EXCEL). See more information at FAO Country Profiles.
- GAO (General Automotive Ontology) – an ontology for the automotive industry that includes 'car' extensions
- GOLD, General Ontology for Linguistic Description
- GUM (Generalized Upper Model), a linguistically motivated ontology for mediating between clients systems and natural language technology
- IDEAS Group, a formal ontology for enterprise architecture being developed by the Australian, Canadian, UK and U.S. Defence Depts.
- Linkbase, a formal representation of the biomedical domain, founded upon Basic Formal Ontology.
- LPL, Landmark Pattern Language
- LTO (Literary Theme Ontology), an ontology of literary themes for computational literary studies.
- NCBO Bioportal, biological and biomedical ontologies and associated tools to search, browse and visualise
- NIFSTD Ontologies from the Neuroscience Information Framework: a modular set of ontologies for the neuroscience domain.
- OBO-Edit, an ontology browser for most of the Open Biological and Biomedical Ontologies
- OBO Foundry, a suite of interoperable reference ontologies in biology and biomedicine
- OMNIBUS Ontology, an ontology of learning, instruction, and instructional design
- Ontology for Biomedical Investigations, an open-access, integrated ontology of biological and clinical investigations
- ONSTR, Ontology for Newborn Screening Follow-up and Translational Research, Newborn Screening Follow-up Data Integration Collaborative, Emory University, Atlanta.
- Plant Ontology for plant structures and growth/development stages, etc.
- POPE, Purdue Ontology for Pharmaceutical Engineering
- PRO, the Protein Ontology of the Protein Information Resource, Georgetown University
- ProbOnto, knowledge base and ontology of probability distributions.
- Program abstraction taxonomy
- Protein Ontology for proteomics
- RXNO Ontology, for name reactions in chemistry
- SCDO, the Sickle Cell Disease Ontology, facilitates data sharing and collaborations within the SDC community, amongst other applications (see list on SCDO website).
- Schema.org, for embedding structured data into web pages, primarily for the benefit of search engines
- Sequence Ontology, for representing genomic feature types found on biological sequences
- SNOMED CT (Systematized Nomenclature of Medicine – Clinical Terms)
- Suggested Upper Merged Ontology, a formal upper ontology
- Systems Biology Ontology (SBO), for computational models in biology
- SWEET, Semantic Web for Earth and Environmental Terminology
- SSN/SOSA, The Semantic Sensor Network Ontology (SSN) and Sensor, Observation, Sample, and Actuator Ontology (SOSA) are W3C Recommendation and OGC Standards for describing sensors and their observations.
- ThoughtTreasure ontology
- TIME-ITEM, Topics for Indexing Medical Education
- Uberon, representing animal anatomical structures
- UMBEL, a lightweight reference structure of 20,000 subject concept classes and their relationships derived from OpenCyc
- WordNet, a lexical reference system
- YAMATO, Yet Another More Advanced Top-level Ontology
- YSO – General Finnish Ontology

The W3C Linking Open Data community project coordinates attempts to converge different ontologies into worldwide Semantic Web.

== Libraries ==
The development of ontologies has led to the emergence of services providing lists or directories of ontologies called ontology libraries.

The following are libraries of human-selected ontologies.

- COLORE is an open repository of first-order ontologies in Common Logic with formal links between ontologies in the repository.
- DAML Ontology Library maintains a legacy of ontologies in DAML.
- Ontology Design Patterns portal is a wiki repository of reusable components and practices for ontology design, and also maintains a list of exemplary ontologies.
- Protégé Ontology Library contains a set of OWL, Frame-based and other format ontologies.
- SchemaWeb is a directory of RDF schemata expressed in RDFS, OWL and DAML+OIL.

The following are both directories and search engines.

- OBO Foundry is a suite of interoperable reference ontologies in biology and biomedicine.
- Bioportal (ontology repository of NCBO)
- Linked Open Vocabularies
- OntoSelect Ontology Library offers similar services for RDF/S, DAML and OWL ontologies.
- Ontaria is a "searchable and browsable directory of semantic web data" with a focus on RDF vocabularies with OWL ontologies. (NB Project "on hold" since 2004).
- Swoogle is a directory and search engine for all RDF resources available on the Web, including ontologies.
- Open Ontology Repository initiative
- ROMULUS is a foundational ontology repository aimed at improving semantic interoperability. Currently there are three foundational ontologies in the repository: DOLCE, BFO and GFO.

== Examples of applications ==
In general, ontologies can be used beneficially in several fields.

- Enterprise applications. A more concrete example is SAPPHIRE (Health care) or Situational Awareness and Preparedness for Public Health Incidences and Reasoning Engines which is a semantics-based health information system capable of tracking and evaluating situations and occurrences that may affect public health.
- Geographic information systems bring together data from different sources and benefit therefore from ontological metadata which helps to connect the semantics of the data.
- Domain-specific ontologies are extremely important in biomedical research, which requires named entity disambiguation of various biomedical terms and abbreviations that have the same string of characters but represent different biomedical concepts. For example, CSF can represent Colony Stimulating Factor or Cerebral Spinal Fluid, both of which are represented by the same term, CSF, in biomedical literature. This is why a large number of public ontologies are related to the life sciences. Life science data science tools that fail to implement these types of biomedical ontologies will not be able to accurately determine causal relationships between concepts.

== See also ==
- Commonsense knowledge bases
- Concept map
- Controlled vocabulary
- Classification scheme (information science)
- Folksonomy
- Formal concept analysis
- Formal ontology
- General Concept Lattice
- Knowledge graph
- Lattice
- Ontology
- Ontology alignment
- Ontology chart
- Open Semantic Framework
- Semantic technology
- Soft ontology
- Terminology extraction
- Weak ontology
- Web Ontology Language

Related philosophical concepts

- Alphabet of human thought
- Characteristica universalis
- Interoperability
- Level of measurement
- Metalanguage
- Natural semantic metalanguage
