= SIOC =

SIOC may mean:

- Ships in own container
- Semantically Interlinked Online Communities
- Socialism in One Country
