= EduTECH (conference) =

Australian education conference

- EduTECH Logo
- Status: Active
- Genre: Education, Technology
- Venue: International Convention Centre Sydney
- Location: Sydney
- Country: Australia
- Inaugurated: 2011
- Attendance: 10,300 (2019)
- Organiser: Terrapinn Ltd
- Website: www.edutech.net.au

EduTECH is an annual two-day education and ed-tech conference and trade show launched in Australia in 2011 by Craig Macfarlane, co-founder of Association & Communications Events (ACEvents). ACEvents and the EduTECH brand was subsequently acquired by Terrapinn Limited in 2015. EduTECH brings together over 10,000 educators from pre-schools, schools, universities, vocational education, training organisations and corporate trainers, as well as Government education departments and a myriad of education products and solution providers, to discuss latest education trends and methods, and to find ways to improve teaching and learning. EduTECH is well known to be the largest education event in the Southern Hemisphere and APAC region. The conference is held annually between June - August. In 2023, EduTECH took place at the Melbourne Convention and Exhibition Centre on 24 and 25 August 2023. Previous events ran at the International Convention Centre Sydney by Terrapinn Ltd.

== Overview ==
EduTECH consists of multiple concurrent streams and specialised masterclasses and breakaway seminars, forums and learning labs. Masterclasses include K-12, higher education, VET sector, university, IT admin, library management, and workplace training. The K-12 Education Leaders class discusses technology and learning practices that reflect global education. The K-12 IT directors and managers class aims to establish and implement technology visions for schools. The K-12 Business managers and administrators class showcases practices for reducing costs, increasing efficiency, and boosting revenue through technology.

There are also many vendors present at the venue, including Google, showing its Google Classroom for Education, Microsoft, JB Hi-Fi, Apple, Canva, infrastructure companies, wireless networking, data filtering, device manufacturers, software, smart-board makers, textbook publishers, learning management system companies, library software, hosting companies, teleconferencing, and furniture makers.

The national conference and exhibition of educational technology began in 2011 with 520 attendees but has since grown to over 15,000 annual attendees. In 2016, it was announced that the conference would be held in Sydney the following year.

=== 2026 Conference ===
Will be held on 3 & 4 June 2026, at the International Convention Centre, Sydney.

=== 2025 Conference ===
Held on 11 & 12 June 2025, International Convention Centre, Sydney. One keynote speaker was Sal Khan.

=== 2024 Conference ===
Held on 13 & 14 August 2024, Melbourne Convention and Exhibition Centre.

=== 2023 Conference ===
Held on 23-25 August 2023, Melbourne Convention and Exhibition Centre.

=== 2022 Conference ===
EduTECH 2022 ran on 10 and 11 August 2022 at the Melbourne Exhibition and Convention Centre in partnership with the Victorian Government and the Victoria Department of Education and Training. A 15,000m2 floorplan had space for over 350 trade booths.

=== 2020 and 2021 Conferences ===
Due to the Coronavirus pandemic, the 2020 and 2021 events were pivoted to virtual-only events. Even in the virtual format the events continued to run multiple parallel streams (called 'channels) plus virtual breakout sessions, plus a virtual trade show. Over 15,000 people attended on-line (live and on-demand for 45 days) to hear from over 300 speakers and close to 150 exhibitors.

=== 2019 Conference ===
EduTECH 2019 had over 10,300 attendees across the two-day Congress and Expo. The Congress included 5 parallel conferences, 8 pre-event masterclasses, 250+ speakers, 300+ exhibitors, and 1 exhibition, on 6 and 7 June 2019. Sir Ken Robinson discussed why physical education in schools is just as maths, science, and humanities.

=== 2018 Conference ===
EduTECH 2018 consists of 9 congresses, multiple masterclasses, 220+ speakers, 400+ exhibitors and 1 exhibition took place on 7 and 8 June 2018. 'Future of technology in the classroom' was debated at EduTech conference.

=== 2017 Conference ===
In 2017, EduTECH had over 8,000 in attendance for its eight congresses, nine masterclasses, and other conferences. Speakers for the event included author of 'Mindset' Carol Dweck, Director of Development ESSA Academy (UK) Abdul Chohan and Astronaught Greg Chamitoff.

=== 2016 Conference ===
In 2016, EduTECH had over 6,600 in attendance for its eight congresses, eight masterclasses, and other conferences. Featured speakers for the event included former CEO of Telstra David Thodey, Fuji Xerox Australia manager Pam Fleming, Andy Hargreaves, New Frontier 21 Consulting CEO Anthony Muhammad, and game designer Jane McGonigal. The smart phone program QParents, an app that allows parents to access a child's personal details, was announced at the expo.

=== 2015 Conference ===
EduTECH 2015 had over 250 exhibits with approximately 6,000 attendees. The official dinner was held for 900 participants. Eight conferences were held with eight master classes following. The conference also featured TeachMeets and break-out sessions. Keynote speakers included Heidi Hayes Jacobs, Eric Sheninger, Larry Rosenstock, and Eric Mazur.

=== 2014 Conference ===
The 2014 EduTECH event was attended by 5,200 people and an official event dinner had over 800 guests. The show had over 200 exhibitors. There were nine conferences and eight masterclasses which were led by industry leaders including Sugata Mitra, Ewan MacIntosh, and Gary Stager. Ken Robinson was keynote speaker in 2014.

=== 2013 Conference ===
EduTECH 2013 had over 3,000 participants and over 150 exhibitors. The keynote speech was given by Daniel H. Pink, author and former speechwriter for Al Gore. The 2013 speakers included Ken Robinson, an educationalist featured on TED talk, Salman Khanm, Alan November and Stephen Heppell.
