= Doap =

Doap may refer to:

- Dead or Alive Paradise
- Doap Nixon
- DOAP (Description of a Project, RDF Schema)
