= SSSD =

SSSD may refer to:

- Scranton State School for the Deaf
- Shanksville-Stonycreek School District
- Sulphur Springs School District
- System Security Services Daemon
- Simple Sloppy Semantic Database
