= Boards.ie =

Irish Internet forum

boards.ie
- Website type: Classified discussion boards
- Available in: English, Irish; some subforums for other languages
- Owner: Distilled Media
- Creator: John Breslin
- Revenue: Advertising, subscriptions, commercial forums, group coupons
- Website: boards.ie
- Commercial: Yes
- Registration: optional; required to post
- Launched: 1998 (rebranded 2000)
- Current status: Online

boards.ie is a large Internet forum in Ireland.

As of January 2020, the site had more than 360,000 members, 3,200,000 threads and 64 million posts. A wide variety of topics from entertainment (e.g. music, radio television, films) to jobs to politics to bereavement and to personal relationships are widely discussed, mostly from an Irish perspective. It also has sections ("forums") for games and puzzles. Participation in the forums requires free registration.

== History ==
In 1998, John "Cloud" Breslin created a single forum to enable discussion amongst Irish users of the id Software game Quake, while he was a postgraduate student at the National University of Ireland, Galway. This forum was part of the Irish Games Network's quake.ie site, and utilized "Matt's WWWBoard" software. The site gained in popularity until the size of its threads exceeded the capacity of the software. Breslin came into contact with Tom Murphy, who had been administrating a Quake-related forum called Quakapalooza, utilizing Murphy's ASP software. Some non-gaming related forums were added to the service, and the retitled "Cloud Boards" began using the Ultimate Bulletin Board software. Murphy proposed a more general (not just Quake-related) forum, dedicated to general Irish issues in 1999, and considered the name boards.ie to be a more useful and desired domain.

In 2000, Cloud Boards was then rebranded for a more general audience. Limitations in what organizations could register prevented private individuals from registering vanity or custom domains. Breslin had previously been unsuccessful in registering the domain cloud.ie with the Irish domain registry. Murphy entered a bet with Breslin that he could successfully register a domain for a rebranded web forum. Murphy renamed his company Spin Solutions to Boards for a day in order to trick the system, registered the paperwork with the Irish domain registrar for boards.ie, and was granted the domain.

In 2003, boards.ie achieved one million posts to its forums.

In 2007, the boards.ie Ltd. company acquired the rights to boards.us and other domains from Breslin.

In 2008, boards.ie hired its first full-time developer. For the 10th anniversary of boards.ie's first post, the complete data set of its discussions with semantic markup (see SIOC) was made available to researchers, and a competition looking for interesting creations based on this data was launched. Later that year in August, boards.ie saw its first shareholding investment from Daft Media Ltd.

In July 2025, it was announced that the site is in financial difficulty and may close in subsequent months. An optional monthly subscription was set up to increase revenue.

== Structure ==
The site is majority owned by Distilled Media Ltd with a minority stake held by some of the original company founders, who delegate administrative and editorial control over the site to hundreds of unpaid moderators.

Currently, Tom Murphy is operating as acting managing director after the departure of the previous managing director, Gerry Shanahan, in February 2009. There are over 1,350 forums, public and private.

It is operated by Boards.ie Limited, an Irish Commercial Company, more specifically in the same headquarters of Daft.ie (DAFT MEDIA LIMITED), in Golden Lane, Dublin 8, both of which are owned by the Distilled Media Group. Boards.ie Limited is considered a small company, since its balance sheet total does not exceed 4.4million euro, and is registered as a commercial company involved in "computer and related activities." Boards.ie Ltd was set up on 24 January 2000 in Dublin 8.

Boards.ie started life as a forum for the computer game, Quake, in 1998. It was registered as a company two years later. In 2008, it was considered one of the largest indigenous Irish websites. However, its 2014 accounts shown it had accumulated losses of €445,000 and rising, dropping more than €100,000 in those 12 months alone. It also had a hole of €65,000 in its balance sheet, a full four years after Daft got involved.

A new forum can be proposed by anyone, but requires a certain amount of support from other members. Most users do not pay any usage fees, although subscription is offered with benefits such as custom avatars and a change of username, amongst other features.

== Expansion ==
The boards.ie site expanded into a number of other countries including boards.org.uk (United Kingdom), boards.us (United States), boards.jp (Japan), boards.com.cn (China), and boards.co.nz (New Zealand), but all have since closed. Sites associated with classified advertising (adverts.ie) and group coupons (boardsdeals.ie) have also been established.

== Cyber-attacks ==
On 21 January 2010 at 11:20 GMT, boards.ie director Tom Murphy took the site offline after an attack on the forum's database. The attack originated from a source outside Ireland. A portion of the database, including usernames, encrypted passwords and email addresses were accessed. The site advised all users who used the same password on other websites to change it there too.

A DDoS attack in January 2016 disabled boards.ie for a few days. Starting on 17 January, the sustained attack brought the site down on 18 January; the site resumed service on 20 January. Other major Irish sites also experienced attacks in the same timeframe.

== Awards ==
boards.ie was awarded a Zeddy Award in 2001. (The Zeddy Awards have since been discontinued.) It also won a Golden Spider Award in the same year.

For his contribution to Irish society, Tom Murphy was awarded a Net Visionary Award by the Irish Internet Association in 2004 in the "Social Contribution" category.

John Breslin was awarded Net Visionary Awards by the Irish Internet Association in 2005 and 2006.

boards.ie won two awards in the Irish Web Awards 2008, "Best Website in Ireland" and "Best Discussion Forum". It also won "Best Social Networking and Community Website" in the Golden Spider Awards 2008.

== See also ==
- thejournal.ie
