= Public health informatics =

Applied field of study

Public health informatics has been defined as the systematic application of information and computer science and technology to public health practice, research, and learning. It is one of the subdomains of health informatics, which is data management applied to medical systems.

The structure of public health informatics data collection and management in the United States is divided between the federal and state levels. The Centers for Disease Control and Prevention (CDC) is the responsible federal agency, while at the state level responsibility lies with the state departments of health. These programs have standardized the reporting of digital health data by hospitals and clinics. The government departments can then gather this data, analyze it, and use it for a variety of purposes. Such purposes typically fall under the three major domains of public health informatics: understanding complex processes, storing a record of public health data, and analyzing and publishing a general version of gathered data for public consumption. Data collected from social media can also be included in these processes to refine their accuracy.

Job opportunities in this field include positions with the CDC and the American Medical Informatics Association, which provides information about informatics for professionals in medical fields.

== In the United States ==
In developed countries such as the United States, public health informatics is practiced by individuals in public health agencies at the federal and state levels and in the larger local health jurisdictions. Additionally, research and training in public health informatics take place at a variety of academic institutions.

At the federal Centers for Disease Control and Prevention in Atlanta, Georgia, the Public Health Surveillance and Informatics Program Office (PHSIPO) focuses on advancing the state of information science and applies digital information technologies to aid in the detection and management of diseases and syndromes in individuals and populations.

The bulk of the work of public health informatics in the United States, as with public health generally, takes place at the state and local level, in the state departments of health and the county or parish departments of health. At a state health department the activities may include collection and storage of vital statistics (birth and death records); collection of reports of communicable disease cases from doctors, hospitals, and laboratories, used for infectious disease surveillance; display of infectious disease statistics and trends; collection of child immunization and lead screening information; daily collection and analysis of emergency room data to detect early evidence of biological threats; and collection of hospital capacity information to allow for planning of responses in case of emergencies. Each of these activities presents its own information processing challenge.

== Collection of public health data ==
Since the beginning of the World Wide Web, public health agencies with sufficient information technology resources have been transitioning to web-based collection of public health data, and, more recently, to automated messaging of the same information. In the years roughly 2000 to 2005 the Centers for Disease Control and Prevention, under its National Electronic Disease Surveillance System (NEDSS), built and provided free to states a comprehensive web and message-based reporting system called the NEDSS Base System (NBS). Because of limited funding and concerns about fragmented, jurisdiction-specific systems, only a few states and larger counties have built their own versions of electronic disease surveillance systems, such as Pennsylvania's PA-NEDSS. Unlike the federal NEDSS product, these systems do not provide timely, full interstate notification services.

To promote interoperability, the CDC has encouraged the adoption in public health data exchange of several standard vocabularies and messaging formats from the health care world. The most prominent of these are: the Health Level 7 (HL7) standards for health care messaging; the LOINC system for encoding laboratory test and result information; and the Systematized Nomenclature of Medicine (SNOMED) vocabulary of health care concepts.

Since about 2005, the CDC has promoted the idea of the Public Health Information Network to facilitate the transmission of data from various partners in the health care industry and elsewhere (hospitals, clinical and environmental laboratories, doctors' practices, pharmacies) to local health agencies, then to state health agencies, and then to the CDC. At each stage the entity must be capable of receiving the data, storing it, aggregating it appropriately, and transmitting it to the next level. A typical example is infectious disease data: hospitals, labs, and doctors are legally required to report it to local health agencies, local health agencies must report it to their state public health department, and the states must report it in aggregate form to the CDC. Among other uses, the CDC publishes the Morbidity and Mortality Weekly Report (MMWR) based on these data acquired systematically from across the United States.

Major issues in the collection of public health data are: awareness of the need to report data; lack of resources of either the reporter or collector; lack of interoperability of data interchange formats, which can be at the purely syntactic or at the semantic level; and variation in reporting requirements across the states, territories, and localities.

Public health informatics can be viewed as falling into three categories.

=== Studying health data models ===
The first category is to discover and study models of complex systems, such as disease transmission. This can be done through different types of data collection, such as hospital surveys or electronic surveys submitted to an organization such as the CDC. Transmission rates and disease incidence and surveillance data can be obtained through government organizations, such as the CDC, or global organizations, such as WHO. Other public health indicators can also be studied. Public health informatics can also examine health insurance coverage and the rates at which insured and uninsured people go to the doctor. Before the advent of the internet, public health data in the United States, like other healthcare and business data, were collected on paper forms and stored centrally at the relevant public health agency. If the data were to be computerized they required a distinct data entry process, were stored in the various file formats of the day , and were analyzed by mainframe computers using standard batch processing.

=== Storing public health data ===
The second category is to find ways to improve the efficiency of different public health systems. This involves the collection and storage of data and the use of that data to address current health problems. To keep everything standardized, vocabulary and word usage need to be consistent across all systems. Finding new ways to link and share new data with current systems is important to keep everything up to date.

Storage of public health data shares the same data management issues as other industries. Like other industries, the details of how these issues play out are affected by the nature of the data being managed.

Due to the complexity and variability of public health data, like health care data generally, the issue of data modeling presents a particular challenge. While a generation ago flat data sets for statistical analysis were the norm, today's requirements of interoperability and integrated sets of data across the public health enterprise require more sophistication. The relational database is increasingly the norm in public health informatics. Designers and implementers of the many sets of data required for various public health purposes must find a workable balance between very complex and abstract data models, such as HL7's Reference Information Model (RIM) or CDC's Public Health Logical Data Model, and simpler, ad hoc models that public health practitioners without informatics training can develop and work with.

Due to the variability of the incoming data to public health jurisdictions, data quality assurance is also a major issue.

=== Maintaining current public health data ===
Finally, the last category can be thought of as maintaining and enriching current systems and models to adapt to the overflow of data and the storing and sorting of this data. This can be as simple as connecting directly to an electronic data collection source, such as health records from a hospital, or publishing information about disease rates and transmission, as the CDC does. Finding new algorithms that can sort through large quantities of data quickly and effectively is also necessary.

The need to extract usable public health information from the mass of data available requires the public health informaticist to become familiar with a range of analysis tools, ranging from business intelligence tools to produce routine or ad hoc reports, to sophisticated statistical analysis tools such as DAP/SAS and PSPP/SPSS, to Geographical Information Systems (GIS) to expose the geographical dimension of public health trends. Such analyses usually require methods that appropriately secure the privacy of the health data. One approach is to separate the individually identifiable variables of the data from the rest. Social media is also used to analyze health trends. Since the late 2000s, data from social media websites such as Twitter and Facebook, as well as search engines such as Google and Bing, have been used extensively in detecting trends in public health.

== Industry ==
Organizations that provide information for professionals interested in public health informatics include the American Medical Informatics Association (AMIA). AMIA is intended for professionals involved in health care, informatics research, and biomedical research, including physicians, scientists, researchers, and students. The main goals of AMIA are to move from 'bench to bedside', help improve the impact of health innovations and advance the public health informatics field. It holds annual conferences, online classes and webinars, which are free to its members. It also has a career center for the biomedical and health informatics community.

Jobs and fellowships in public health informatics are offered by various organizations. The CDC has various fellowship programs, while multiple colleges and companies offer degree programs or training in this field.

- Programs | Johns Hopkins | Bloomberg School of Public Health
- "What We Do". www.phii.org.
- SAPPHIRE (Health care) or Situational Awareness and Preparedness for Public Health Incidences and Reasoning Engines is a semantics-based health information system capable of tracking and evaluating situations and occurrences that may affect public health.

== See also ==
- Culturomics
- Public health surveillance
