= Giant Global Graph =

Giant Global Graph (GGG) is a name coined in 2007 by Tim Berners-Lee to help distinguish between the nature and significance of the content on the existing World Wide Web and that of a promulgated next-generation web, presumptively named Web 3.0. In common usage, "World Wide Web" refers primarily to a web of discrete information objects readable by human beings, with functional linkages provided between them by human-created hyperlinks. Next-generation Web 3.0 information designs go beyond the discrete web pages of previous generations by emphasizing the metadata which describe information objects like web pages and attribute the relationships that conceptually or semantically link the information objects to each other. Additionally, Web 3.0 technologies and designs enable the organization of entirely new kinds of human- and machine-created data objects.

An important related concept that overlaps with Giant Global Graph without fully encompassing it is that of the Semantic Web.

Social networking services are one of the earliest and best-known examples of this distinction. In a Social Network, the information about relationships between people, and the kinds of data objects those people share, is at least as important as the data objects themselves. Plus, participants in a Social Network create new kinds of data that did not exist on the web before, such as their Likes for other people's comments and content. Currently, these new kinds of data are primarily structured and mediated by the proprietary systems of companies like Facebook. In the ideal future of the decentralized Giant Global Graph or Semantic Web, such information would be structured in such a way that it could be readable by many different systems and dynamically organized into many different user-readable formats.

The GGG concept also relates to the Decentralization of Internet Information, whereby properly-formatted semantic web data objects can be organized and their relationships discerned by any computer on the Internet, rather than solely being organized by large centralized systems such as Facebook and Google. For instance, people using the FOAF protocol to organize information on websites or other Internet nodes can define and interact with their social networks without necessarily requiring the intervention of centralized systems like Facebook.

Crucially, where the term Web 3.0 refers to a suite of technologies and to a particular phase in the development of the web, the term Giant Global Graph is intended to refer more generally to the total environment of information that will be generated and sustained through the implementation of these technologies. This environment will be a qualitatively different one than that which existed before the development of these technologies.

As of 2017, anticipated progress toward a pervasive semantic web has been side-tracked by the widespread application of machine learning technologies to process existing, unstructured data and content, and that it is no longer clear whether a Web 3.0 epoch will materialize as originally envisioned.

== History ==
The term Giant Global Graph was notably used the first time by the inventor of the World Wide Web, Tim Berners-Lee, on his blog.

Tim Berners-Lee thinks about the social network itself that is inside and between social-network Web sites such as Facebook. He assumes that people can use the word "Graph" to distinguish these from the "Web". Then he says that, although he called this graph the Semantic Web, maybe it should have been called the "Giant Global Graph".

"GGG" has been used several times by Berners-Lee and by others in other blogs. GGG may be described as the content plus pointers of the WWW transitioning to content plus pointers plus relationships plus descriptions.

Significantly, the Giant Global Graph concept seems to have been a significant input in Facebook's concept and name for their "Open Graph" project and protocol, which is their effort to spread their approach to social networking beyond the bounds of the Facebook website, allowing a broader network or "graph" of connections between Facebook users, and between Facebook users and the Internet data objects which interest them.

== See also ==
- peer-to-peer
- distributed system
