= FOAF =

Semantic Web ontology to describe relations between people

- Friend of a friend
- FOAF logo
- Abbreviation: FOAF
- Status: Published
- Year started: 2000; 26 years ago
- First published: June 3, 2005; 21 years ago
- Latest version: 0.99; January 14, 2014; 12 years ago
- Series: Namespace Document
- Authors: Dan Brickley, Libby Miller
- Base standards: RDF, OWL
- Domain: Semantic Web
- License: CC BY 1.0
- Website: xmlns.com/foaf/spec/

FOAF (an acronym of friend of a friend) is a machine-readable ontology describing persons, their activities and their relations to other people and objects. Anyone can use FOAF to describe themselves. FOAF allows groups of people to describe social networks without the need for a centralised database.

FOAF is a descriptive vocabulary expressed using the Resource Description Framework (RDF) and the Web Ontology Language (OWL). Computers may use these FOAF profiles to find, for example, all people living in Europe, or to list all people both you and a friend of yours know. This is accomplished by defining relationships between people. Each profile has a unique identifier (such as the person's e-mail addresses, international telephone number, Facebook account name, a Jabber ID, or a URI of the homepage or weblog of the person), which is used when defining these relationships.

The FOAF project, which defines and extends the vocabulary of a FOAF profile, was started in 2000 by Libby Miller and Dan Brickley. It can be considered the first Social Semantic Web application, in that it combines RDF technology with 'social web' concerns.

Tim Berners-Lee, in a 2007 essay, redefined the semantic web concept into the Giant Global Graph (GGG), where relationships transcend networks and documents. He considers the GGG to be on equal ground with the Internet and the World Wide Web, stating that "I express my network in a FOAF file, and that is a start of the revolution."

== WebID ==
FOAF is one of the key components of the WebID specifications, in particular for the WebID+TLS protocol, which was formerly known as FOAF+SSL.

== Deployment ==
Although it is a relatively simple use-case and standard, FOAF has had limited adoption on the web. For example, the Live Journal and DeadJournal blogging sites support FOAF profiles for all their members, My Opera community supported FOAF profiles for members as well as groups. FOAF support is present on Identi.ca, FriendFeed, WordPress and TypePad services.

Yandex blog search platform supports search over FOAF profile information. Prominent client-side FOAF support was available in Safari web browser before RSS support was removed in Safari 6 and in the Semantic Radar plugin for Firefox browser. Semantic MediaWiki, the semantic annotation and linked data extension of MediaWiki supports mapping properties to external ontologies, including FOAF which is enabled by default.

There are also modules or plugins to support FOAF profiles or FOAF+SSL authorization for programming languages, as well as for content management systems.

== Example ==
The following FOAF profile (written in Turtle format) states that James Wales is the name of the person described here. His e-mail address, homepage and depiction are web resources, which means that each can be described using RDF as well. He has Wikimedia as an interest, and knows Angela Beesley (which is the name of a 'Person' resource).

@prefix rdf: <http://www.w3.org/1999/02/22-rdf-syntax-ns#> .
@prefix rdfs: <http://www.w3.org/2000/01/rdf-schema#> .
@prefix foaf: <http://xmlns.com/foaf/0.1/> .

<#JW>
    a foaf:Person ;
    foaf:name "James Wales" ;
    foaf:mbox <mailto:jwales@bomis.com> ;
    foaf:homepage <http://www.jameswales.com> ;
    foaf:nick "Jimbo" ;
    foaf:depiction <http://www.jameswales.com/aus_img_small.jpg> ;
    foaf:interest <http://www.wikimedia.org> ;
    foaf:knows [
        a foaf:Person ;
        foaf:name "Angela Beesley"
    ] .

<http://www.wikimedia.org>
    rdfs:label "Wikimedia" .

== History ==
=== Versions ===
FOAF vocabulary versions
Version	Date	Namespace URI	Description
0.98	August 9, 2010	http://xmlns.com/foaf/0.1/	
0.99	January 14, 2014	http://xmlns.com/foaf/0.1/	Current version Paddington Edition
Legend: Unsupported Latest version

== See also ==
- Resource Description Framework (RDF)
- Web Ontology Language (OWL)
- Social web
- Semantic Web
- Description of a Career (DOAC)
- Description of a Project (DOAP)
- Semantically-Interlinked Online Communities (SIOC)
- hCard (HTML vCard)
- XHTML Friends Network (XFN)
