= DoneDeal =

Irish online marketplace

DoneDeal.ie
- Website type: Classifieds website
- Founded: May 11, 2005; 21 years ago
- Founders: Fred Karlsson; Geraldine Karlsson
- Website: www.donedeal.ie
- Advertising: Yes
- Registration: Optional
- Launched: June 2006; 20 years ago

DoneDeal Cars is an Irish online marketplace focused on helping buyers and sellers of cars in Ireland. It is Ireland's No. 1 Car Marketplace, with more cars for sale from car dealerships than any other site.

The site was founded in May 2005 by Fred Karlsson, a native of Sweden, and his Irish wife Geraldine.

== History ==
The founders were inspired to set up the site after returning to Ireland from Sweden where they had used similar websites. Initially, the ads included their own belongings before real users started placing ads.

By late 2008, DoneDeal was experiencing a notable growth in visitor figures – monthly visitors to the site had jumped from 175,000 per month in November 2007 to 561,000 in November 2008. The site became so popular in Ireland that €1bn worth of goods were sold through the site in 2011, a €300m increase from 2010. Following an independent ABC audit in 2011, it was found that DoneDeal had the most visited motoring classifieds website in Ireland. By late 2011 "DoneDeal" had become the fastest growing search term in Ireland for 2011 according to Google. In 2016, there were over almost 1 million ads placed in the motor section of DoneDeal.

== Business model ==
While the site was originally free to use, a €3 charge was introduced after about a year. The site featured a system where people could place ads and pay by calling a special number which would bill to their phone, as well as credit or debit card and PayPal account. In 2012, the DoneDeal pricing model changed – with some ads reduced to €1 and others increased to €5. In 2015, free ads were re-introduced in the Clothes and Lifestyle, Baby & Kids, Music & Education, Sports & Hobbies and House & DIY sections with the remaining sections incurring a charge of between €1 and €5.

In 2011, Oslo international media group Schibsted Media Group took a 50.09% stake in the company. In July 2015, the Irish-owned Distilled Media Group and the Schibsted Media Group announced the establishment of a combined business, Distilled SCH, which brings together the three iconic Irish brands: DoneDeal.ie, Daft.ie and Adverts.ie.

Apps have played a part in the accessibility of DoneDeal with an iPhone app launched in 2011, followed by an Android app in 2012. DoneDeal ventured into television advertising for the first time in 2012 with a popular and amusing ad featuring a woman who sells her husband on DoneDeal.

Since 2010, DoneDeal raised €1.3million for charity by donating a portion of ad revenue to causes selected by its staff. The company is ABC audited and is a member of the Interactive Advertising Bureau in Ireland.
