= Daft.ie =

Property website in Ireland

- Website type: Real estate and property rental website
- Owner: Distilled SCH Ltd
- Creators: Brian Fallon; Eamonn Fallon
- Website: daft.ie
- Launched: 1997; 29 years ago

Daft.ie is a real estate and property rental website in Ireland, launched in 1997. The website was co-founded by brothers Brian and Eamonn Fallon, who each held a 23.66% share in the business as of October 2021.

As of September 2024, the website attracted 2.5 million users every month, according to the Irish Examiner.

== History ==
The website was established in 1997 by Rathgar brothers Brian and Eamonn Fallon, aged just 20 and 15 at the time, who were frustrated by the need of having to rely on newspaper classifieds in order to find a place to live. Speaking to Irish technology news website Silicon Republic in 2013, Eamonn Fallon explained the origins of the company:

I guess if we really researched it properly we wouldn't have done it... Back then in the late Nineties there were only 50,000 people online – you couldn't really build an online business back then with that amount of people using technology. I was still in college at Trinity when we started the business. What changed the game was these free internet discs that were being dispersed for dial-up and I think we were in the right place, the right time and we were the right age...

Fallon explained that in the early days of the business, the brothers didn't seek investment, which he later regarded as a good thing in hindsight as investors would have been looking for a faster return on their money. "It took us nearly six years to make any money at all. When I think back, the adoption rate for internet was low, smartphones weren't on the horizon. It was really just the naivety of youth I suppose." Fallon recalled that the moment he realised the Daft.ie project was working was when he mentioned to an old college friend that he would shortly be moving out of his current house and the friend recommended Daft.ie as a good place to find a new place.

In a 2011 restructuring, Daft Media was acquired by Distilled Media, and an independent Audit Bureau of Circulations (ABC) showed that Distilled Media was Ireland's largest online publishing group in terms of unique monthly users, with monthly page impressions totalling 223 million. By comparison, RTÉ.ie, the webpage of Irish broadcaster Raidió Teilifís Éireann, was only recording 117.2m monthly page impressions at that point.

By 2013, daft.ie had been subsumed into Fallon's wider group named Distilled Media which Silicon Republic described as an "online empire". Other brands in the group included the online news site TheJournal.ie, boards.ie, thescore.ie and property.ie, as well as Daft.ie, which was noted as "continu(ing) to thrive". By November 2013, Distilled Media employed more than 60 people, but the company stated that it intended to have "more than 150 employees within two years".

In 2015, Daft.ie along with sister company adverts.ie, were merged with Norway-based Schibsted Media's DoneDeal.ie. The deal saw Distilled and Schibsted each hold a 50% shareholding in the group. In 2019, Schibsted spun off the majority of their online marketplaces business into a new company called Adevinta (no).

As of December 2019, the Irish Independent reported that "nine out of every ten properties for sale in Ireland appear on daft.ie and the site lists approximately 70,000 properties for sale or to rent at any one time".

The company was negatively affected at the start of the COVID-19 pandemic, and reported "a decline in revenues over a number of months during 2020". However, by October 2021 the company reported that "current trends suggest that revenues are recovering."

At the end of November 2024, Dublin-based fund management company Blacksheep Fund Management Ltd. bought a stake in Distilled Ltd. The financial terms of the purchase were not disclosed at the time, however "Sky News reported that the possible transaction could be worth in the region of €500m".

== See also ==
- DoneDeal, an Irish online marketplace
