= Semantically Interlinked Online Communities =

Semantic web technology to connect platforms

SIOC project logo

Semantically Interlinked Online Communities Project (SIOC (/ʃɒk/ SHOK)) is a Semantic Web technology. SIOC provides methods for interconnecting discussion methods such as blogs, forums and mailing lists to each other. It consists of the SIOC ontology, an open-standard machine-readable format for expressing the information contained both explicitly and implicitly in Internet discussion methods, of SIOC metadata producers for a number of popular blogging platforms and content management systems, and of storage and browsing/searching systems for leveraging this SIOC data.

The SIOC vocabulary is based on RDF and is defined using RDFS. SIOC documents may use other existing ontologies to enrich the information described. Additional information about the creator of the post can be described using FOAF Vocabulary and the foaf:maker property. Rich content of the post (e.g., an HTML representation) can be described using the AtomOWL or RSS 1.0 Content module.

The SIOC project was started in 2004 by John Breslin and Uldis Bojars at DERI, NUI Galway. In 2007, SIOC became a W3C Member Submission.

== Example ==
<sioc:Post rdf:about="http://johnbreslin.com/blog/2006/09/07/creating-connections-between-discussion-clouds-with-sioc/">
    <dc:title>Creating connections between discussion clouds with SIOC</dc:title>
    <dcterms:created>2006-09-07T09:33:30Z</dcterms:created>
    <sioc:has_container rdf:resource="http://johnbreslin.com/blog/index.php?sioc_type=site#weblog"/>
    <sioc:has_creator>
        <sioc:UserAccount rdf:about="http://johnbreslin.com/blog/author/cloud/" rdfs:label="Cloud">
            <rdfs:seeAlso rdf:resource="http://johnbreslin.com/blog/index.php?sioc_type=user&sioc_id=1"/>
        </sioc:UserAccount>
    </sioc:has_creator>
    <foaf:maker rdf:resource="http://johnbreslin.com/blog/author/cloud/#foaf"/>
    <sioc:content>SIOC provides a unified vocabulary for content and interaction description: a semantic layer that can co-exist with existing discussion platforms.
    </sioc:content>
    <sioc:topic rdfs:label="Semantic Web" rdf:resource="http://johnbreslin.com/blog/category/semantic-web/"/>
    <sioc:topic rdfs:label="Blogs" rdf:resource="http://johnbreslin.com/blog/category/blogs/"/>
    <sioc:has_reply>
        <sioc:Post rdf:about="http://johnbreslin.com/blog/2006/09/07/creating-connections-between-discussion-clouds-with-sioc/#comment-123928">
            <rdfs:seeAlso rdf:resource="http://johnbreslin.com/blog/index.php?sioc_type=comment&sioc_id=123928"/>
        </sioc:Post>
    </sioc:has_reply>
</sioc:Post>

== See also ==
- DOAP
- Online Presence Ontology
- SKOS
- XML
