= SAPPHIRE (health care) =

The Situational Awareness and Preparedness for Public Health Incidences and Reasoning Engines (SAPPHIRE) is a semantics-based health information system capable of tracking and evaluating situations and occurrences that may affect public health. It was developed in 2004 by Dr. Parsa Mirhaji at the University of Texas Health Science Center at Houston using the Semantic Web technologies.

== Technology ==
SAPPHIRE is based upon developing Semantic Web technologies — a set of formats and programming languages (such as the Resource Description Framework language and the Web Ontology Language (OWL)) that find and analyze data on the World Wide Web to enable users to understand and utilize organized information online. The system is used to gather, organize and impart information on important happenings and events, assisting public health-care professionals to prepare and act. It permits data to be interpreted distinctly, meeting the specific needs of diverse industries, users and disciplines rather than a generalized, universal format. The SAPPHIRE system was developed by the Health Science Center using the RDF technologies developed by Oracle, Inc. and TopQuadrant, Inc.

== Function ==
SAPPHIRE helps track specific incidences such as the spread and treatment of influenza, AIDS and related information. The system frequently gathers information from select public hospitals, emergency services and care providers and their electronic health records and information provided by medical professionals. The information is integrated and categorized - flu-related symptoms are analyzed for trends that may indicate probabilities of flu epidemics. Such data is transmitted to institutions such as the Centers for Disease Control and Prevention. SAPPHIRE's processes have also reduced the administrative burdens and inefficiencies at hospitals and clinics.

== Usage after Hurricane Katrina ==
The University of Houston conducted a pilot test of SAPPHIRE in the aftermath of Hurricane Katrina in the fall of 2005, which devastated the populations and infrastructures of southern Mississippi, Louisiana, Alabama and Texas. Implemented swiftly within hours of mass evacuations, the SAPPHIRE system successfully monitored and analyzed public health information for the usage of government officials and services, who feared outbreaks of epidemics. Officials used hand-held computers to gather data from the evacuees and transmit directly to the SAPPHIRE database. SAPPHIRE was specifically used to analyze the health of the evacuees at the Astrodome, Reliant Park and the George R. Brown Convention Center. A PDA extension of SAPPHIRE enabled more than 300 volunteers, led by the UT School of Public Health, to collect and analyze critical health data. SAPPHIRE gathered information from nearly 9,000 confidential patient cases of the past to help services respond to the specific needs of the evacuees, helping to identify environment-specific vulnerabilities, prevalence and conditions for diseases and epidemics. SAPPHIRE was recorded to have assisted in identifying outbreaks of gastrointestinal, respiratory diseases and conjunctivitis much sooner than previously possible.

== See also ==
- Ontology (computer science)
- FOAF (software)
