= Old Ireland in Colour =

2020 non-fiction book by John Breslin and Sarah-Anne Buckley

- Front cover from the first edition of Old Ireland in Colour by John Breslin and Sarah-Anne Buckley
- Author: John Breslin and Sarah-Anne Buckley
- Illustrator: John Breslin
- Cover artist: John Breslin and Latte Goldstein
- Language: English
- Series: Old Ireland in Colour
- Release number: 1
- Subject: General history of Ireland
- Publisher: Merrion Press
- Publication date: 5 October 2020
- Publication place: Ireland
- Media type: Print (Hardback) / Digital
- Pages: 304
- Awards: Best Irish-Published Book Award at the Irish Book Awards 2020
- ISBN: 978-1-785-37370-1
- OCLC: 1247654905
- Dewey Decimal: 941.5082
- LC Class: DA951 .B74 2020
- Followed by: Old Ireland in Colour 2, Old Ireland in Colour 3
- Website: https://www.oldirelandincolour.com

Old Ireland in Colour is the first in a series of non-fiction history books written by Irish academics John Breslin and Sarah-Anne Buckley. Released in Ireland in 2020 and in the US in 2021, it consists chiefly of colourisations of black-and-white historical photographs by Breslin along with historical context and captions written by Buckley.

It was Ireland's bestselling book during Christmas 2020 and was winner of the Best Irish-Published Book Award 2020. A sequel, Old Ireland in Colour 2, was announced in July 2021 and published in September 2021. A third book in the series, Old Ireland in Colour 3, was published in October 2023.

== Background ==
In August 2019, Breslin set up the Old Ireland in Colour project, which uses a combination of artificial intelligence techniques (such as DeOldify) and human artistry (using Photoshop) to colourise and restore historical photographs of Ireland and Irish people from the 19th and 20th centuries. Following on from the success of this project on social media, in March 2020 he approached his University of Galway colleague, the historian Sarah-Anne Buckley, to collaborate on an Old Ireland in Colour book featuring a curated selection of these photographs, and this was published by Merrion Press in October 2020.

== Overview ==
The Old Ireland in Colour book is divided into five sections: The Irish Revolution; Society and Culture; Women and Children; The Irish Abroad; and Scenic Ireland. The book contains over 170 photographs, with about 30 to 40 colourised photographs per section.

== Research ==
In interviews with CNN and others, Breslin has spoken about the extensive research carried out into clothes colours, military uniforms, buildings and roofs, eye and hair colours (for example, using various passenger or prison records where available) and which was used for manually changing the colourised photographs.

== Launch ==
Due to the COVID-19 pandemic, the book did not have any formal launch or book signings, instead relying on mainstream media coverage both before and after its release.

Breslin and Buckley spoke to the Sunday Independent as part of a multi-page feature in their Life magazine on 18 October 2020. Buckley also talked to Ryan Tubridy on his radio show on 23 October 2020.

On television, Breslin spoke with Ryan Tubridy about the book on The Late Late Show on 20 November 2020.

== Reception ==
Old Ireland in Colour was the number one bestselling book in Ireland from 15 to 28 November 2020 and from 6 to 26 December 2020 according to Nielsen BookScan.

It was also the official Christmas number one in Ireland for 2020 according to Nielsen BookScan, with over 9,000 copies sold in the week prior.

Old Ireland in Colour was Ireland's bestselling book by revenue in 2020, and the sole book to have made more than €1 million in Ireland in 2020. Almost 50,000 copies were sold in just over 10 weeks.

Old Ireland in Colour also won Best Irish-Published Book of the Year at the Irish Book Awards 2020.

On 30 March 2021, Old Ireland in Colour reached a peak of 23 in the overall Books category on Amazon. It was also the number two bestselling book in the History category, ranked after a free audiobook. It was the bestselling book in the European History and Photography History categories at that time.

Reviews for the book have been largely positive: 'Astonishing' (The Irish News); 'Mesmerising' (Irish Examiner); 'Incredibly poignant, beautiful photographs of Old Ireland, given a modern twist' (Irish Independent).

While not specifically referring to this book, some critics have pointed to the potential for misleading results arising from the automatic colourisation of old photographs.

== Sequels ==
A second volume, Old Ireland in Colour 2, also co-authored by John Breslin and Sarah-Anne Buckley, was published by Merrion Press in September 2021. Old Ireland in Colour 2 was the number one bestselling book in Ireland from 21 to 27 November 2021 according to Nielsen BookScan.

== Trivia ==
Three of the seven barefoot children seen in the 1946 photograph that was used on the front cover of Old Ireland in Colour are still living (in New York, Chicago and Kerry), and each of them has been photographed holding a copy of the book by their families.

Despite writing two books together, Breslin and Buckley only met for the first time in person after the publication of Old Ireland in Colour 2 in September 2021.
