= Heidi Hayes Jacobs =

American author and educator

Dr. Heidi Hayes Jacobs
- Born: October 4, 1948 (age 78)
- Education: Ed.D.
- Alma mater: Columbia University (Teachers College); University of Massachusetts Amherst; University of Utah
- Occupations: Author, educator, curriculum consultant
- Employer(s): Curriculum Designers, Inc.
- Known for: Curriculum mapping, curriculum integration, education reform
- Notable work: Curriculum 21; Mapping the Big Picture
- Title: President

Dr. Heidi Hayes Jacobs (born October 4, 1948) is an author and internationally recognized education leader known for her work in curriculum mapping, curriculum integration, and developing 21st century approaches to teaching and learning.

Jacobs is President of Curriculum Designers, Inc. and Executive Director of the Curriculum Mapping Institute. She works as an education consultant with schools and districts K–12 on issues and practices pertaining to: curriculum reform, instructional strategies to encourage critical thinking, and strategic planning.

== Personal ==
Dr. Heidi Hays Jacobs was born on October 4, 1948.

She completed her doctoral work at Columbia University’s Teachers College in 1981. She received her master's degree from the UMass at Amherst; her undergraduate studies were at the University of Utah in her hometown of Salt Lake City.

== Major publications ==
- Bold Moves For Schools: How We Create Remarkable Learning Environments, ASCD, Alexandria, VA 2017. (with Marie Hubley Alcock)
- Curriculum 21: Essential Education for a Changing World, ASCD, Alexandria, VA. January, 2010. (with Jaimie Cloud)
- The Curriculum Mapping Planner: Templates, Tools, and Resources for Effective Professional Development, ASCD, Alexandria, VA. 2009. (with Ann Johnson)
- Active Literacy Across the Curriculum: Strategies for Reading, Writing, Speaking, and Listening, Larchmont, NY. April 2006.
- Getting Results with Curriculum Mapping, ASCD, Alexandria, VA. November, 2004.
- Mapping the Big Picture: Integrating Curriculum and Assessment K–12 ASCD, Alexandria, VA, 1997.
- Interdisciplinary Curriculum: Design and Implementation. ASCD, Alexandria, VA. 1989.

== Field work ==
Jacobs is President of Curriculum Designers, Inc., and Co-founder and Executive Director, of the Curriculum Mapping Institute. She has taught in the Department of Curriculum and Teaching, at Teachers College, Columbia University, New York, from 1981 to the present. She is a co-founder of The Hollingworth Center also at Teachers College, Columbia University.

Dr, Jacobs has consulted with a wide range of organizations including: the College Board, NBC's Sunday Today Show, Children’s Television Workshop, CBS National Sunrise Semester, Association for Supervision and Curriculum Development ASCD, IBM EduQuest, The Discovery Channel, Tapestry Productions, The Kennedy Center, Carnegie Council on Adolescent Development, New York City Ballet Education Department at the Lincoln Center, the Peace Corps, the National School Conference Institute, the Disney Company, Prentice-Hall Publishing, the Near East School Association based in Athens, Greece, International Baccalaureate, the European Council of International Schools, and state education departments.

== Press coverage ==
Interviews and features on Jacobs have appeared in: The New York Times, Educational Leadership, Child Magazine, Sunburst Communications video on Successful Middle Schools, and National Public Radio "Talk of the Nation" Broadcast. Dr. Jacobs has published curriculum materials with Prentice Hall, Milton-Bradley, the Electric Company, and Bowmar Publishing. Video Journal of Education features a series on her work, in addition, two other video series developed by ASCD focus on Dr. Jacobs’ curriculum models. PBS features two of her courses for teachers, "Curriculum Mapping" by Heidi Hayes Jacobs I & II, in their professional development program, PBS TeacherLine, delivered on-line.
