= Jacob Lorhard =

German philosopher (1561–1609)

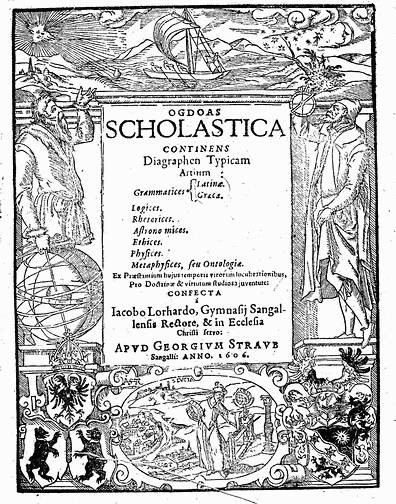
Ogdoas Scholastica,... (1606).

Jacob Lorhard (Latin: Jacobus Lorhardus; 1561 – 19 May 1609) was a German philosopher and pedagogue based in St. Gallen, Switzerland.

== Biography ==
Lorhard was born in Münsingen, in the Duchy of Württemberg. He studied at the University of Tübingen. In 1603 he became Rector of the Gymnasium in St. Gallen. In 1606 he published Ogdoas Scholastica, which contains the word "ontologia" – probably appearing for the first time ever in a book. He uses "Ontologia" synonymously with "Metaphysica". The following year he received the offer of becoming Professor of Theology at the University of Marburg from Landgrave Maurice of Hesse-Kassel. Rudolph Göckel was also professor in Marburg in logic, ethics, and mathematics at this time. Lorhard and Göckel probably met one or several times during 1607 sharing their views with one another. For whatever reason, his stay in Marburg was brief and he soon returned to his former position in St. Gallen. Lorhard died on 19 May 1609.

In 1613, a second edition of Lorhard's book appeared under the title Theatrum Philosophicum. In this edition, however, the word "ontologia" does not appear on the front cover although has been retained inside the book. In the same year the term did appear in Göckel's Lexicon Philosophicum (p. 16), where it is mentioned briefly as follows: "ontologia, philosophia de ente" (i.e., "ontology, the philosophy of being").

Lorhard was influenced by Peter Ramus, who set about transforming dialectical reasoning into a single method of pedagogical logic supplemented by diagrammatical tools. Lorhard follows Ramus in believing that the students will gain a deeper understanding of the ontological truths through considering such diagrams. This became a very influential view on education across Europe, influencing the Danish professor Jens Kraft who used these techniques in a school for young people expected to become national leaders. Kraft thought that a deeper understanding of ontological truths would help the students becoming better people ethically as well as having a better understanding of the world.

He was more directly influenced by Clemens Timpler of Heidelberg, whose Metaphysicae systema methodicum was published in Steinfurt in 1604. Lorhard followed Timpler by defining ontology as “the knowledge of the intelligible by which it is intelligible”. This emphasis on the intelligibility of the world as essential for metaphysics is central to Lorhard’s ontology. By formulating ontology as concentrated on the knowledge by means of which we can understand the world it offers a description of the very foundation of scientific activity.

Lorhard characterised human rationality as 'the natural light of reason'. This approach presupposes there is a unique true ontology that reflects to the world as it really is. This confidence in an order or code of nature that can be read and understood by human beings was one of the major cornerstones for the rise of science in Europe. Lorhard divides the intelligibles into universals and particulars with the set of universals further separated in two sets: the set of basic objects, and the set of attributes. Lorhard uses the homonym real 16 times in Ogdoas Scholastica contrasting it variously with rational (rationalis), imaginary (imaginaria), and verbal (verbalis). Lorhard characterises being (ens) as “by which a being is what it is”. He then further describes how beings that relate to the external world exist independently of human cognition, while those that belong to the internal (or mental) world of human cognition are beings of reason or rationality. Lorhard saw an important duality between the beings themselves and how we rationally discuss such being. He insisted that whenever we discuss the beings in the world with a view to their classification, we also need to reflect on the concepts we are using in doing so. This reflections at the meta-level formed an essential part of Lorhard’s work.

Lorhard describes the ‘most common’ attributes of intelligibles as existence and duration. However, whatever its existence and time, we use the real/imaginary distinction (realis/imaginaria) between what exists independently of all human minds (although conceivable by human rationality) and what is imaginary.

== Works ==
- Disputatio de vera et Aristotelica methodo demonstrandi, Dissertation. Tubingae: Gruppenbach, 1595. OCLC 245988900
- Liber de adeptione veri necessarii seu apodictici ..., Tubingæ, 1597. OCLC 22740196
- Ogdoas Scholastica, continens Diagraphen Typicam artium: Grammatices (Latinae, Graecae), Logices, Rhetorices, Astronomices, Ethices, Physices, Metaphysices, seu Ontologiae, Sangalli : Apud Georgium Straub, 1606. OCLC 41227134
- Theatrum philosophicum, continens Grammaticen Latinam, Graecam, et Hebraeam, Logicen, Rhetoricen, Arithmeticen, Geometriam, Musicen, Astronomicen, Ethicen, Physicen, Metaphysicen seu Ontologiam, Basileæ, 1613. OCLC 186897020 (second edition of Ogdoas Scholastica)
