= Irish Academic Press =

Irish publishing house

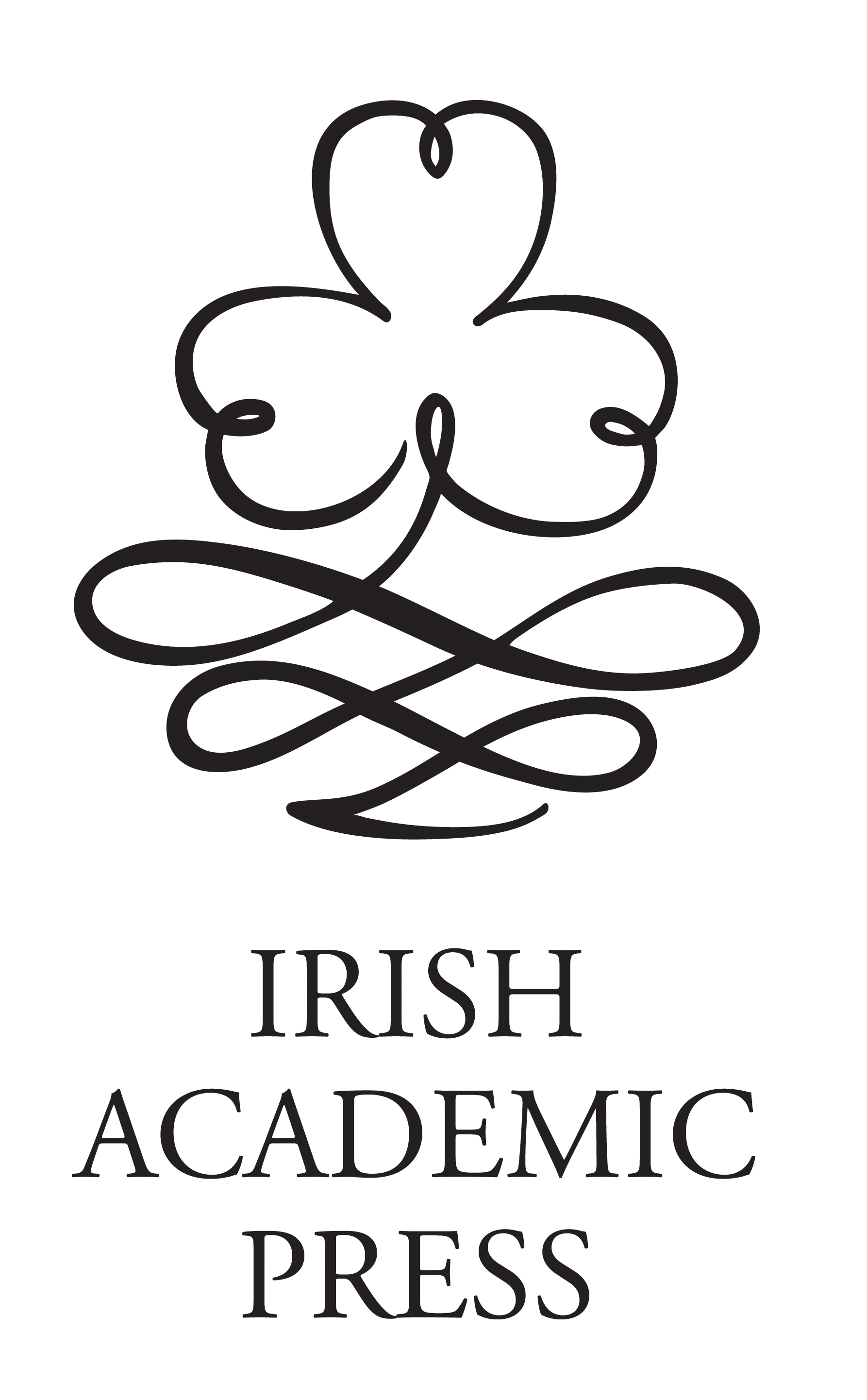
- Founded: 1974
- Founder: Frank Cass
- Successor: Conor Graham
- Country of origin: Ireland
- Headquarters location: Newbridge, County Kildare, Ireland
- Key people: Patrick O'Donoghue, Maeve Convery
- Publication types: Books
- Imprints: Merrion Press
- Official website: irishacademicpress.ie

Irish Academic Press is an independent Irish publishing house that was established in 1974, with a focus on Irish history, politics, literature and the arts.

== History ==
Irish Academic Press was founded by Frank Cass in 1974 and, following his death in 2007, his son Stewart continued and expanded the business. In 2012, the publishing house was acquired by Conor Graham, and the company is now based in Newbridge, County Kildare.

== Merrion Press ==
In 2012, Irish Academic Press launched the imprint Merrion Press, which publishes popular interest history, general interest and fiction. Their bestselling book to date has been Old Ireland in Colour.
