= Yahoo SearchMonkey =

2008–2010 search engine optimiser

Yahoo! SearchMonkey
- Website type: semantic search
- Available in: English
- Owner: Yahoo!
- Commercial: yes
- Registration: no
- Launched: May 2008
- Current status: Offline

Yahoo! SearchMonkey (often misspelled Search Monkey) was a Yahoo! service which allowed developers and site owners to use structured data to make Yahoo! Search results more useful and visually appealing, and drive more relevant traffic to their sites. The service was shut down in October 2010 along with other Yahoo! services as part of the Microsoft and Yahoo! search deal. The name SearchMonkey is an homage to Greasemonkey. Officially the product name has no space and two capital letters.

Yahoo! SearchMonkey was selected as one of the top 10 Semantic Web Products of 2008.

== Default apps ==
SearchMonkey had many default "apps" enabled; some were site-specific while others were object-based.

=== Examples ===
- Dr. Horrible's Sing Along Blog on Amazon
- Inline Rick Rolls
- Thai food on yelp
- SearchMonkey on wikipedia
- Person search

== Creating apps ==
Apps were made through the SearchMonkey Developer Tool. Two types of apps were possible, ones that overwrote the result (Result Apps) and others that displayed below a result (Infobars). App creation was split into two parts, data and presentation.

=== Data ===
The data for an app could be either cached or run-time. Run-time data was limited to infobars, as an external fetch would take too long for the search page to render. Pages could be scraped using XSLT or via a web services call. Any webservice could be queried using a URL Template combined with any cached data. Webservices could be chained to query multiple sources and aggregate them onto the search page. Cached data could come from a variety of sources using standard markup and vocabularies.

- Microformats
- RDFa
- eRDF
- SearchMonkey Feeds

Any data placed on a webpage in these formats would be picked up by Yahoo!'s crawlers and made available to app writers. This data was also available through Yahoo! BOSS (YQL wrapped query or documentation).

One could use the Structured Data Display app to see all the structured data with search results.

=== Presentation ===
The data was transformed into the display template using PHP hosted on Yahoo! servers. It was a simplified stripped down version of the language.

=== End of Life ===
In 2010, Yahoo shutdown SearchMonkey in favor of Microsoft's Bing search engine.
