= Curriculum mapping =

Curriculum mapping is a procedure for reviewing the operational curriculum as it is entered into an electronic database at any education setting. It is based largely on the work of Heidi Hayes Jacobs in Mapping the Big Picture: Integrating Curriculum and Assessment K-12 (ASCD, 1997) and Getting Results with Curriculum Mapping (2004, ASCD). Schools are using curriculum templates that display key components of the curriculum: content, skills, assessments, and essential questions.

Some states such as South Dakota have adopted curriculum mapping on a statewide basis and provide detailed online curriculum mapping resources for their professional staff. Other states such as Indiana have mandated curriculum mapping as a tool for schools which do not meet Adequate Yearly Progress and also provide numerous online tools.

Key to the approach is that each teacher enters what is actually taught in real-time during the school year, in contrast to having an outside or separate committee determine decisions. The entries by teachers are not left alone, however; in fact, because the work is displayed via internet-based programs, it is open to view by all personnel in a school or district. This allows educators to view both K-12 and across grade levels and subjects what is transpiring in order to be informed and to revise their work.

The curriculum mapping model as originally defined by Dr. Jacobs has seven specific steps that schools use to thoroughly examine and then revise their curriculum. There are both commercial companies and not-for-profit groups that have generated curriculum mapping software used around the world. Related to mapping, but separate from it, is the concept of a curriculum audit, described by Fenwick W. English in "Deciding What to Teach and Test: Developing, Auditing, and Aligning the Curriculum" (1999, Sage).

Curriculum mapping is not limited to United States public schools. A number of independent schools have adopted the curriculum mapping process to review and revise their curriculum. The bulk of schools using curriculum mapping outside the US tend to be independent schools that follow an international curriculum (such as IB, AERO, or IGCSE) or public schools located in anglophone countries.

== Consensus Maps ==
A development of a consensus map (also called an essential map, core map, district map, or master map) takes places in Phase 3 of Heidi Hayes Jacobs's Four Phases of Curriculum Mapping. Hale (2008) distinguishes between consensus maps and essential maps, assigning the former to the building level, and the latter to the district level (p. 145). Jacobs (2004) defines a consensus map as one that "reflects the policy agreed on by a professional staff that targets those specific areas in each discipline that are to be addressed with consistency and flexibility in a school or district" (para. 4; Jacobs & Johnson, 2009, p. 65). It provides an opportunity, by thoughtful reflection, for teachers to have a common ground for communication about their curriculum while also maintaining the necessary flexibility to do what is right for each child. Hale (2008) adds that a consensus map functions as a communication tool to convey to stakeholders the students' learning expectations (p. 145). Ideally, it comes later in the curriculum mapping process – after horizontal and vertical data examination and after interdisciplinary or mixed-group review (Jacobs, 2004, para. 13). According to Jacobs and Johnson (2009) mixed group reviews "add a unique perspective to the process and are sometimes able to see things that other teachers do not" (p. 58). For example, a social studies teacher might be able to observe that students are taught the Holocaust in 9th grade social studies and again in 10th grade English. An effective map would seek to marry the two instructional units, eliminating redundancies and providing a cross-disciplinary approach to instruction. By this time, professionals are working on "multiple levels and tiers" (Jacobs, n.d.), reviewing the maps for "possible gaps, repetitions, or omissions" (Jacobs & Johnson, 2009, p. 57). This takes time and, as with all curriculum mapping, cannot be rushed and the big picture must be taken into account. Phase 3 in the Mapping Process is critical because "if we don't have consensus on where we want to go, we will never get there". (Jacobs, n.d.).

A consensus map might include what they district staff have targeted as the "nonnegotiables that will be taught in each grade level or subject in a school or district" and should represent "best practices, 21st century curriculum, higher order thinking, high standards, and clearly defined grade- or course-level expectations" (Jacobs & Johnson, 2009, p. 65). According to Hale (2008), its elements are "compulsory and are designed according to national, state, [or] district... standard[s]" (p. 146). They may include content and skills, essential questions, and required assessments.

== Individual curriculum maps ==
Individual curriculum maps are "developed by individual teachers [and] reflect what they teach in their class or classes. They include essential questions, content, skills, and assessments" (Jacobs & Johnson, 2009, p. 115). More detailed than the consensus map, "allow for individual teacher autonomy" (Hale, 2008, p. 146). In a small school "with only one section of a course or subject, the individual map becomes the consensus map" (Jacobs & Johnson, 2009, p. 65). These maps showcase what takes place in an individual classroom, ideally providing evidence of the students' learning with that teacher. For example, in a Unit applying ELA Standard RL11-12.5, students are expected to learn to "[a]nalyze how an author's choices concerning how to structure specific parts of a text (e.g., the choice of where to begin or end a story, the choice to provide a comedic or tragic resolution) contribute to its overall structure and meaning as well as its aesthetic impact." While a teacher may choose to teach this standard using The Crucible by Arthur Miller, theoretically, another teacher may use a series of short stories, or perhaps even a novel. While the standard is the same and would be represented on the consensus map (as would the common assessments), the individual map would show the different content being employed in the classroom, along with the activities and skill work that might be specific to the piece of literature under study. Jacobs & Johnson (2009) suggest that "[i]deally, a school or district is able to focus on individual maps first, and then map the taught curriculum", though they do acknowledge that some schools do the reverse, often under external influences that can rush the process (p. 67).

Both consensus and individual maps might show the essential questions for units of study and content learned, but individual maps will be more detailed in regards to the daily activities, strategies, and assignments that introduce, practice, and inspire mastery of the skills and standards indicated on the consensus map, the latter of which will also eventually mandate the common or same assessments that should take place across the board in individual classrooms. By the daily trial and error that is inherent in an individual map, resources might be suggested to the consensus map.

There are online programs that offer insight to curriculum mapping throughout the year.
