= Education informatics =

Education Informatics is a sub-field of informatics. The primary focus is on computer applications, systems and networks that support research in and delivery of education. Education informatics is based upon information science, computer science and education but particularly addresses the intersection of these broad areas. Note that it is distinct from Informatics Education, a term that relates more to the practice of teaching/learning about informatics, rather than the use of information science and technology in the support of teaching and learning. The term has been in use since at least 1980.

== Applications ==
Education informatics is operationalized through learning analytics and educational data mining, which facilitate the analysis of data generated within educational contexts. These approaches enable researchers and educational institutions to identify patterns in student performance, learning behavior, and engagement. Educational data mining typically involves the applying of computational techniques to educational datasets, while learning analytics focuses on collecting and analyzing learner data to enhance understanding of learning processes and environments.

Empirical research substantiates these claims. For example, a comprehensive review of 402 studies demonstrated that educational data mining and learning analytics have been employed for purposes including prediction, behavioral analysis, and visualization within higher education.

== Sources ==
- Carr, Jo Ann; O'Brien, Nancy P. (2010). "Policy Implications of Education Informatics". Teachers College Record 112 (10): 2703–2710.
- Ford, Nigel (2008). Web-based learning through educational informatics: Information science meets educational computing. Hershey, NY: Information Science Publishing.
- Levy, Philippa et Nigel Ford, Jonathon Foster, Andrew Madden, David Miller, Miguel Baptista Nunes, Maggie McPherson and Sheila Webber (2003). Educational informatics: an emerging research agenda. Journal of Information Science, 29 (4) 2003, pp. 298–310.
