= Jaimie Cloud =

Jaimie P. Cloud
- Occupation: Nonprofit administration

Jaimie P. Cloud is an American sustainability educator and advocate in New York City, New York. Cloud has been recognized for her contributions to the fields of sustainability education and school reform. She is the founder and president of the nonprofit Cloud Institute for Sustainability Education, which used to be the Sustainability Education Center at the American Forum for Global Education.

== About ==
Cloud is from the Midwestern United States, and taught global studies curriculum in New York City public schools before founding the Cloud Institute for Sustainability Education. "Cloud teaches extensively, and writes and facilitates the collaborative development of numerous instructional units and programs that are designed to teach core courses across the disciplines through the lens of sustainability and to inspire young people to think about the world, their relationship to it, and their ability to influence it in an entirely new way."

== Affiliations ==
Cloud is the chair of Communities for Learning, Inc. and co-chair of the Harbor education task force of the Metropolitan Waterfront Alliance. She is a member of the advisory committee of the Buckminster Fuller Institute, the international advisory committee for the Tbilisi+30 Conference, the planning committee for Education for Sustainability of the North American Association for Environmental Education, and the Sustainability Education Planning Committee for the National Association of Independent Schools. Cloud serves on the Ecozone advisory board of Eco Media, Inc., and the editorial board of the International Journal of Education for Sustainable Development.

== Bibliography ==
- Cloud, J.P. (2018) "Redefining Education Together: Synergies of Environmental Education and Education for Sustainability" Green Schools Catalyst Quarterly. Jaimie P. Cloud and Jen Cirillo, June 2018
- Cloud, J.P. (2018) "Educating for the Future We Want" The Maine Journal of Conservation and Sustainability. Jaimie Cloud, May 2018
- Cloud, J.P. (2017) Education for a Sustainable Future, Benchmarks: For Individual and Social Learning. Journal of Sustainability Education. Jaimie Cloud, et al. 2017
- Cloud, J.P. (2017) "Why Dream - The Impact of Visioning" Green Schools Catalyst Quarterly, Jaimie Cloud, September 2017
- Cloud, J.P. (2012) The Cloud Institute's Education for Sustainability Standards and Performance Indicators. The Cloud Institute for Sustainability Education. Jaimie Cloud, 2012
- Cloud, J.P. (2010) "Educating for a Sustainable Future.” Curriculum 21 Essential Education for a Changing World. Ed Heidi Hayes Jacobs. 2010.
- Cloud, J.P. (2009) "Kindergarten through Twelfth Grade Education: Fragmentary Progress in Equipping Students to Think and Act in a Challenging World." Agenda for a Sustainable America. Ed John Dernbach
- Cloud, J.P. (2005) "Some Systems Thinking Concepts for Environmental Educators during the Decade of Education for Sustainable Development," Applied Environmental Educations and Communication: an International Journal, 4(3). July–September 2005. p 225–228.
- Cloud, J.P. (2004) "Education for Sustainability: What is Its Core Content?" NAAEE Communicator. 1(10).
- Cloud, J.P., Federico, C., Byrne, J., et al. (2003) "Kindergarten Through Twelfth Grade Education for Sustainability". The Environmental Law Reporter News and Analysis. 33(2). February 2003. Environmental Law Institute.
- Cloud, J.P. (2000) "Foreword," in Wheeler, K. and Perraca B. Education for a Sustainable Future: A Paradigm of Hope for the 21st Century.

== Interviews ==
- "How Do We Educate for the Future We Want?" Storigins January 2020.
- "Not Instant Orange Juice — Educating for Sustainability," Leverage Points. 78.
- "Education for a Sustainable World," Bioneers.
