= Content completeness problem =

The inability of an ontology to include or encode every concept of interest to users of an ontology is known as the "content completeness problem". The problem stems from the greater expressiveness of natural language relative to the finite enumeration of concepts present in an ontology. A specific instance of this problem may be temporarily resolved by adding missing concept/s to the target ontology, but this approach is not a general solution because in practice:

1. There is a lag time between the appearance and usage of a concept in a domain and its incorporation into an ontology.
2. In large ontologies it is difficult to know if the concept is already present

Other workarounds to this problem include the use of post-coordination in ontologies (such as SNOMED CT) using free text or comment fields to supplement ontology entry systems.

The first usage of the term "content completeness problem" was by Elkin, but it was described by Rogers and Rector in 1997.
