= Digital Enterprise Research Institute =

Irish-based research institute

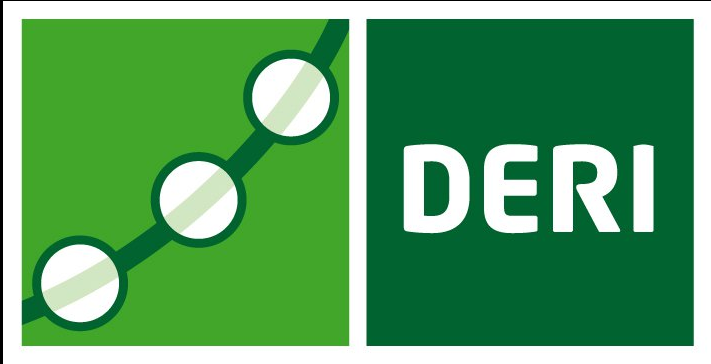
- Headquarters: Galway, Ireland
- Area served: Worldwide
- Services: Research
- Parent: National University of Ireland, Galway
- Website: www.deri.ie

The Digital Enterprise Research Institute (DERI) is a former research institute at NUI Galway. It is now part of the Insight Centre for Data Analytics. Insight was established in 2013 by Science Foundation Ireland with funding of €75m.

DERI's focus is research into the Semantic Web and linked data. It was originally established as a Centre for Science, Engineering and Technology (CSET) in 2003 with funding from Science Foundation Ireland. Additional funding sources were EU Framework Programs, Enterprise Ireland, IRCSET, and industry.

== History ==
DERI was opened in 2003 with funding from Science Foundation Ireland. In addition projects from the European Commission and Enterprise Ireland extended the research program. As scientific director Dieter Fensel was hired from the University of Innsbruck. As executive director Christoph Bussler was hired from Oracle. Additional leadership was provided by Stefan Decker (Information Sciences Institute, University of Southern California) and David O'Sullivan (National University of Ireland). In 2006 Stefan Decker took over the Director position, and Michael Turley took over the Chief Executive Position. Manfred Hauswirth became deputy director. DERI grew rapidly from 2 persons in 2003 to about 40 in 2006, and then to about 100 in 2008. In 2008 DERI secured a second funding round from Science Foundation Ireland of about 12 Million Euro, and established itself as a premier research facility for Web research in general, and Semantic Web and Linked Data research in particular. In 2013 Science Foundation Ireland decided to establish a new centre for Data Analytics by combining four existing centers operating in the space: DERI (NUI Galway), Clarity (UCD), TRILL(UCD), 4C (UCC) & CLIQUE (UCD). With the establishment of the Insight Centre the DERI brand, after more than 10 years of successful operation, was retired. Subsequently Manfred Hauswirth became director of Fraunhofer FOCUS, and Stefan Decker of Fraunhofer FIT, both in Germany.

== Description ==
=== Employees and financials ===
In late 2011, DERI employed around 130 people. In 2011, DERI had about 6 million Euro in revenue. In 2010, the Science Foundation Ireland consisted of 55% of awards by value; the remainder was composed of the European Commission (40%); and businesses (5%).

=== Facilities ===
DERI was based at the Dangan Business Park in Galway, Ireland.

== Organisation ==
DERI now operates as part of the Insight Centre for Data Analytics. It is still part of the National University of Ireland, Galway and is organised around a number of research units and application domains.

Name	Research Unit or Domain	Reference
Social Semantic Collaboration	It focuses on Semantic Desktop research.	
Data Intensive Infrastructure		

== Contributions ==
DERI contributed or initiated a number of technologies, standards and initiatives. Some notable technologies include the Semantic Web, the Semantic Desktop, scalable RDF information processing, Open Data Government Portals, W3C Standards and efforts like SPARQL and Semantically-Interlinked Online Communities.

In its data centers it hosted several big data facilities for indexing what was called the "web of data" the web of pages annotated with metadata (also Semantic Web). Among these the early SWSE engine, led by Dr. Andreas Hearth and the Sindice engine (the Semantic Indice - italian for index) engine led by Dr. Giovanni Tummarello and Dr. Renaud Delbru, which then evolved into the Siren.io company.

== Spin-off companies ==
Spin-off companies included music-tech start-up MDG Web, data intelligence and analytics company Siren.io (previously Sindicetech, developed out of the Sindice), and financial analytics start-up Peracton (building MAARS),

== Memberships ==
DERI was a W3C member organization and a founding member of the Web Science Trust Network.
