= Simple Sloppy Semantic Database =

Simple Sloppy Semantic Database (S3DB) is a distributed data management system that relies on Semantic Web concepts for management of heterogeneous data.

S3DB is open source software, licensed under a Creative Commons Attribution-Noncommercial-Share Alike 3.0 United States License. It is written in PHP.

== History ==
S3DB was first proposed in 2006, following the argumentation the previous year that omics data sets would be more easily managed if stored as RDF triples.

The first version, 1.0, was focused on the support of an indexing engine for triplestore management.

The second version, made available in October 2007, added cross-referencing between triples in distinct S3DB deployments to support it as a distributed infrastructure.

The third version was released in July 2008 and exposes its API through a specialized query language, S3QL, accessible as a REST web service. An update of that release (version 3.5) also includes a RESTful SPARQL endpoint. This update introduced a self-update feature which replaces version numbers by date of update.

In 2011, S3DB's API was published and was put to use in the management of a clinical trial at MDAnderson Cancer Center using a web application with a self-assembled interface.

== Assessments ==
The rationale, core data model, and usage in National Cancer Institute (NIH/NCI) SPORE awards are described and illustrated in a 2008 PLoS ONE manuscript and a 2010 BMC Bioinformatics manuscript.

A 2012 survey paper stated, "S3QL supports a permission control mechanism that allows users to specify contextual minutiae such as provenance and access control on the semantic level. The effectiveness of S3QL was illustrated through use cases of IB, such as genomic characterization of cancer and molecular epidemiology of infectious diseases. We expect S3QL or its variations to be accepted as the standard access control mechanism by the SW community".
