= Stefan Decker =

Computer scientist

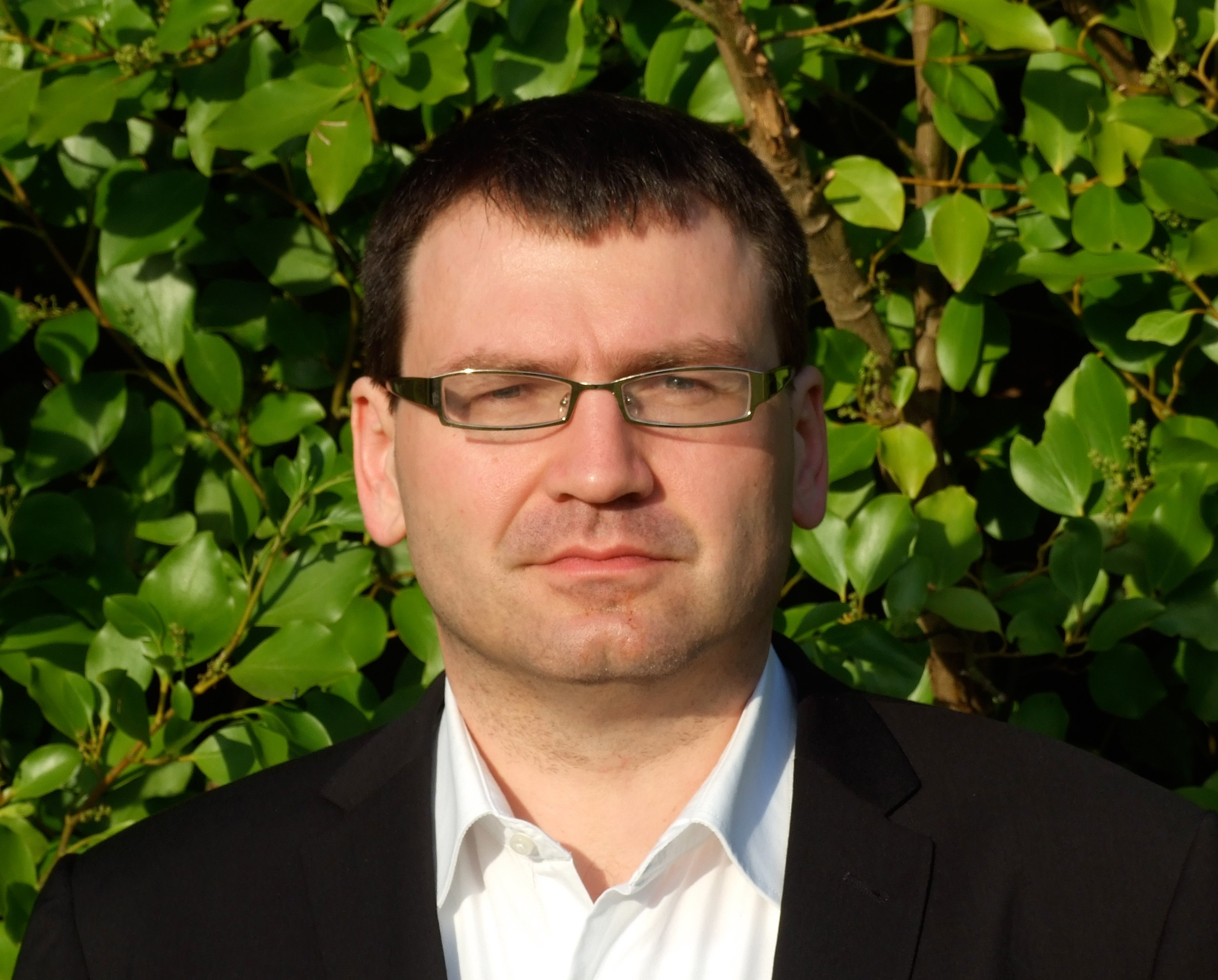
- Citizenship: German
- Education: University of Kaiserslautern, Karlsruhe Technical University
- Known for: Semantic Web research
- Scientific career
- Workplaces: RWTH Aachen University, Fraunhofer Institute for Applied Information Technology

Stefan Josef Decker is a computer scientist, Professor for Database and Information Systems at RWTH Aachen University, and Managing Director of the Fraunhofer Institute for Applied Information Technology. He specializes in the Semantic Web, Link Data, Knowledge Graphs and Computer Science. As of January 25th, 2020, his research reached 21,206 (with h-index of 83 and i10-index of 201) Google Scholar Citations, notable for a Semantic Web researchers.

He was formerly Professor of Digital Enterprise at the National University of Ireland Galway, and executive director of the Digital Enterprise Research Institute, Galway. Prof. Decker studied Computer Science at the University of Kaiserslautern. He received his doctorate at the Karlsruhe Technical University.

He was elected to the Royal Irish Academy in 2010.

== Selected research ==
- Bischof, Stefan, et al. "Mapping between RDF and XML with XSPARQL." Journal on Data Semantics 1.3 (2012): 147–185.
- Grosof, Benjamin N., et al. "Description logic programs: combining logic programs with description logic." Proceedings of the 12th international conference on World Wide Web. 2003.
- Noy, Natalya F., et al. "Creating semantic web contents with protege-2000." IEEE intelligent systems 16.2 (2001): 60–71.
- Decker, Stefan, et al. "The semantic web: The roles of XML and RDF." IEEE Internet Computing 4.5 (2000): 63–73.
