= DOAP =

Description of a Project

Description of a Project (DOAP) is an RDF Schema and XML vocabulary designed to describe software projects, particularly free and open-source software.

It was created and initially developed by Edd Wilder-James (Edd Dumbill) to convey semantic information associated with open source software projects.

== Adoption ==
There are currently generators, validators, viewers, and converters to enable more projects to be able to be included in the semantic web. In 2007 Freecode listed 43 000 projects as published with DOAP. It was used in the Python Package Index but is no longer supported there.

As of 2025, inclusion of DOAP files is common in the source code of GNOME projects.

Major properties include: homepage, developer, programming-language, os.

== Examples ==
The following is an example in RDF/XML:

<rdf:RDF xmlns:rdf="http://www.w3.org/1999/02/22-rdf-syntax-ns#" xmlns:doap="http://usefulinc.com/ns/doap#">
 <doap:Project>
  <doap:name>Example project</doap:name>
  <doap:homepage rdf:resource="http://example.com" />
  <doap:programming-language>javascript</doap:programming-language>
  <doap:license rdf:resource="http://example.com/doap/licenses/gpl"/>
 </doap:Project>
</rdf:RDF>

Other properties include Implements specification, anonymous root, platform, browse, mailing list, category, description, helper, tester, short description, audience, screenshots, translator, module, documenter, wiki, repository, name, repository location, language, service endpoint, created, download mirror, vendor, old homepage, revision, download page, license, bug database, maintainer, blog, file-release and release.

== See also ==
- Software Package Data Exchange
