= Computer Science Ontology =

Automatically generated taxonomy of research topics in the field of Computer Science

- Developer(s): The Open University
- Stable release: CSO 3.2 / June 2020
- Type: Ontology; Taxonomy; Linked data
- License: Creative Commons Attribution 4.0 International License
- Website: cso.kmi.open.ac.uk

The Computer Science Ontology (CSO) is an automatically generated taxonomy of research topics in the field of Computer Science. It was produced by the Open University in collaboration with Springer Nature by running an information extraction system over a large corpus of scientific articles. Several branches were manually improved by domain experts. The current version (CSO 3.2) includes about 14K research topics and 160K semantic relationships.

CSO is available in OWL, Turtle, and N-Triples. It is aligned with several other knowledge graphs, including DBpedia, Wikidata, YAGO, Freebase, and Cyc. New versions of CSO are regularly released on the CSO Portal.

CSO is mostly used to characterise scientific papers and other documents according to their research areas, in order to enable different kinds of analytics. The CSO Classifier is an open-source python tool for automatically annotating documents with CSO.

== Applications ==
- Recommender Systems.
- Computing the semantic similarity of documents.
- Extracting metadata from video lecture subtitles.
- Performing bibliometrics analysis.

== See also ==
- Ontology (information science)
- Semantic Web
- Knowledge graph
- DBpedia
- YAGO
- Freebase
- Cyc
- ACM Computing Classification System
- Mathematics Subject Classification (MSC)
- Physics and Astronomy Classification Scheme (PACS)
- PhySH (Physics Subject Headings)
