= Upper ontology =

Ontology applicable across domains of knowledge

In information science, an upper ontology (also known as a top-level ontology, upper model, or foundation ontology) is an ontology (in the sense used in information science) that consists of very general terms (such as "object", "property", "relation") that are common across all domains. An important function of an upper ontology is to support broad semantic interoperability among a large number of domain-specific ontologies by providing a common starting point for the formulation of definitions. Terms in the domain ontology are ranked under the terms in the upper ontology, e.g., the upper ontology classes are superclasses or supersets of all the classes in the domain ontologies.

A number of upper ontologies have been proposed, each with its own proponents.

Library classification systems predate upper ontology systems. Though library classifications organize and categorize knowledge using general concepts that are the same across all knowledge domains, neither system is a replacement for the other.

== Development ==
Any standard foundational ontology is likely to be contested among different groups, each with its own idea of "what exists". One factor exacerbating the failure to arrive at a common approach has been the lack of open-source applications that would permit the testing of different ontologies in the same computational environment. The differences have thus been debated largely on theoretical grounds, or are merely the result of personal preferences. Foundational ontologies can however be compared on the basis of adoption for the purposes of supporting interoperability across domain ontologies.

No particular upper ontology has yet gained widespread acceptance as a de facto standard. Different organizations have attempted to define standards for specific domains. The 'Process Specification Language' (PSL) created by the National Institute of Standards and Technology (NIST) is one example.

Another important factor leading to the absence of wide adoption of any existing upper ontology is the complexity. Some upper ontologies—Cyc is often cited as an example in this regard—are very large, ranging up to thousands of elements (classes, relations), with complex interactions among them and with a complexity similar to that of a human natural language, and the learning process can be even longer than for a natural language because of the unfamiliar format and logical rules. The motivation to overcome this learning barrier is largely absent because of the paucity of publicly accessible examples of use. As a result, those building domain ontologies for local applications tend to create the simplest possible domain-specific ontology, not related to any upper ontology. Such domain ontologies may function adequately for the local purpose, but they are very time-consuming to relate accurately to other domain ontologies.

To solve this problem, some genuinely top level ontologies have been developed, which are deliberately designed to have minimal overlap with any domain ontologies. Examples are Basic Formal Ontology and the DOLCE (see below).

=== Arguments for the infeasibility of an upper ontology ===
Historically, many attempts in many societies have been made to impose or define a single set of concepts as more primal, basic, foundational, authoritative, true or rational than all others. A common objection to such attempts points out that humans lack the sort of transcendent perspective — or God's eye view — that would be required to achieve this goal. Humans are bound by language or culture, and so lack the sort of objective perspective from which to observe the whole terrain of concepts and derive any one standard. Thomasson, under the headline "1.5 Skepticism about Category Systems", wrote: "category systems, at least as traditionally presented, seem to presuppose that there is a unique true answer to the question of what categories of entity there are – indeed the discovery of this answer is the goal of most such inquiries into ontological categories. [...] But actual category systems offered vary so much that even a short survey of past category systems like that above can undermine the belief that such a unique, true and complete system of categories may be found. Given such a diversity of answers to the question of what the ontological categories are, by what criteria could we possibly choose among them to determine which is uniquely correct?"

Another objection is the problem of formulating definitions. Top level ontologies are designed to maximize support for interoperability across a large number of terms. Such ontologies must therefore consist of terms expressing very general concepts, but such concepts are so basic to our understanding that there is no way in which they can be defined, since the very process of definition implies that a less basic (and less well understood) concept is defined in terms of concepts that are more basic and so (ideally) more well understood. Very general concepts can often only be elucidated, for example by means of examples, or paraphrase.

- There is no self-evident way of dividing the world up into concepts, and certainly no non-controversial one
- There is no neutral ground that can serve as a means of translating between specialized (or "lower" or "application-specific") ontologies
- Human language itself is already an arbitrary approximation of just one among many possible conceptual maps. To draw any necessary correlation between English words and any number of intellectual concepts, that we might like to represent in our ontologies, is just asking for trouble. (WordNet, for instance, is successful and useful, precisely because it does not pretend to be a general-purpose upper ontology; rather, it is a tool for semantic / syntactic / linguistic disambiguation, which is richly embedded in the particulars and peculiarities of the English language.)
- Any hierarchical or topological representation of concepts must begin from some ontological, epistemological, linguistic, cultural, and ultimately pragmatic perspective. Such pragmatism does not allow for the exclusion of politics between persons or groups, indeed it requires they be considered as perhaps more basic primitives than any that are represented.

Those who doubt the feasibility of general purpose ontologies are more inclined to ask "what specific purpose do we have in mind for this conceptual map of entities and what practical difference will this ontology make?" This pragmatic philosophical position surrenders all hope of devising the encoded ontology version of "The world is everything that is the case." (Wittgenstein, Tractatus Logico-Philosophicus).

Finally, there are objections similar to those against artificial intelligence. Technically, the complex concept acquisition and the social / linguistic interactions of human beings suggest any axiomatic foundation of "most basic" concepts must be cognitive biological or otherwise difficult to characterize since we don't have axioms for such systems. Ethically, any general-purpose ontology could quickly become an actual tyranny by recruiting adherents into a political program designed to propagate it and its funding means, and possibly defend it by violence. Historically, inconsistent and irrational belief systems have proven capable of commanding obedience to the detriment or harm of persons both inside and outside a society that accepts them. How much more harmful would a consistent rational one be, were it to contain even one or two basic assumptions incompatible with human life?

=== Arguments for the feasibility of an upper ontology ===
Many of those who doubt the possibility of developing wide agreement on a common upper ontology fall into one of two traps:

1. they assert that there is no possibility of universal agreement on any conceptual scheme; but they argue that a practical common ontology does not need to have universal agreement, it only needs a large enough user community (as is the case for human languages) to make it profitable for developers to use it as a means to general interoperability, and for third-party developer to develop utilities to make it easier to use; and
2. they point out that developers of data schemes find different representations congenial for their local purposes; but they do not demonstrate that these different representations are in fact logically inconsistent.

In fact, different representations of assertions about the real world (though not philosophical models), if they accurately reflect the world, must be logically consistent, even if they focus on different aspects of the same physical object or phenomenon. If any two assertions about the real world are logically inconsistent, one or both must be wrong, and that is a topic for experimental investigation, not for ontological representation. In practice, representations of the real world are created as and known to be approximations to the basic reality, and their use is circumscribed by the limits of error of measurements in any given practical application. Ontologies are entirely capable of representing approximations, and are also capable of representing situations in which different approximations have different utility. Objections based on the different ways people perceive things attack a simplistic, impoverished view of ontology. The objection that there are logically incompatible models of the world is true, but in an upper ontology those different models can be represented as different theories, and the adherents of those theories can use them in preference to other theories, while preserving the logical consistency of the necessary assumptions of the upper ontology. The necessary assumptions provide the logical vocabulary with which to specify the meanings of all of the incompatible models. It has never been demonstrated that incompatible models cannot be properly specified with a common, more basic set of concepts, while there are examples of incompatible theories that can be logically specified with only a few basic concepts.

Many of the objections to upper ontology refer to the problems of life-critical decisions or non-axiomatized problem areas such as law or medicine or politics that are difficult even for humans to understand. Some of these objections do not apply to physical objects or standard abstractions that are defined into existence by human beings and closely controlled by them for mutual good, such as standards for electrical power system connections or the signals used in traffic lights. No single general metaphysics is required to agree that some such standards are desirable. For instance, while time and space can be represented in many ways, some of these are already used in interoperable artifacts like maps or schedules.

Objections to the feasibility of a common upper ontology also do not take into account the possibility of forging agreement on an ontology that contains all of the primitive ontology elements that can be combined to create any number of more specialized concept representations. Adopting this tactic permits effort to be focused on agreement only on a limited number of ontology elements. By agreeing on the meanings of that inventory of basic concepts, it becomes possible to create and then accurately and automatically interpret an infinite number of concept representations as combinations of the basic ontology elements. Any domain ontology or database that uses the elements of such an upper ontology to specify the meanings of its terms will be automatically and accurately interoperable with other ontologies that use the upper ontology, even though they may each separately define a large number of domain elements not defined in other ontologies. In such a case, proper interpretation will require that the logical descriptions of domain-specific elements be transmitted along with any data that is communicated; the data will then be automatically interpretable because the domain element descriptions, based on the upper ontology, will be properly interpretable by any system that can properly use the upper ontology. In effect, elements in different domain ontologies can be *translated* into each other using the common upper ontology. An upper ontology based on such a set of primitive elements can include alternative views, provided that they are logically compatible. Logically incompatible models can be represented as alternative theories, or represented in a specialized extension to the upper ontology. The proper use of alternative theories is a piece of knowledge that can itself be represented in an ontology. Users that develop new domain ontologies and find that there are semantic primitives needed for their domain but missing from the existing common upper ontology can add those new primitives by the accepted procedure, expanding the common upper ontology as necessary.

Most proponents of an upper ontology argue that several good ones may be created with perhaps different emphasis. Very few are actually arguing to discover just one within natural language or even an academic field. Most are simply standardizing some existing communication. Another view advanced is that there is almost total overlap of the different ways that upper ontologies have been formalized, in the sense that different ontologies focus on different aspects of the same entities, but the different views are complementary and not contradictory to each other; as a result, an internally consistent ontology that contains all the views, with means of translating the different views into the other, is feasible. Such an ontology has thus far not been constructed, however, because it would require a large project to develop so as to include all of the alternative views in the separately developed upper ontologies, along with their translations. The main barrier to construction of such an ontology is not the technical issues, but the reluctance of funding agencies to provide the funds for a large enough consortium of developers and users.

Several common arguments against upper ontology can be examined more clearly by separating issues of concept definition (ontology), language (lexicons), and facts (knowledge). For instance, people have different terms and phrases for the same concept. However, that does not necessarily mean that those people are referring to different concepts. They may simply be using different language or idiom. Formal ontologies typically use linguistic labels to refer to concepts, but the terms that label ontology elements mean no more and no less than what their axioms say they mean. Labels are similar to variable names in software, evocative rather than definitive. The proponents of a common upper ontology point out that the meanings of the elements (classes, relations, rules) in an ontology depend only on their logical form, and not on the labels, which are usually chosen merely to make the ontologies more easily usable by their human developers. In fact, the labels for elements in an ontology need not be words — they could be, for example, images of instances of a particular type, or videos of an action that is represented by a particular type. It cannot be emphasized too strongly that words are *not* what are represented in an ontology, but entities in the real world, or abstract entities (concepts) in the minds of people. Words are not equivalent to ontology elements, but words *label* ontology elements. There can be many words that label a single concept, even in a single language (synonymy), and there can be many concepts labeled by a single word (ambiguity). Creating the mappings between human language and the elements of an ontology is the province of Natural Language Understanding. But the ontology itself stands independently as a logical and computational structure. For this reason, finding agreement on the structure of an ontology is actually easier than developing a controlled vocabulary, because all different interpretations of a word can be included, each *mapped* to the same word in the different terminologies.

A second argument is that people believe different things, and therefore can't have the same ontology. However, people can assign different truth values to a particular assertion while accepting the validity of certain underlying claims, facts, or ways of expressing an argument with which they disagree. (Using, for instance, the issue/position/argument form.) This objection to upper ontologies ignores the fact that a single ontology can represent different belief systems, and also representing them as different belief systems, without taking a position on the validity of either.

Even arguments about the existence of a thing require a certain sharing of a concept, even though its existence in the real world may be disputed. Separating belief from naming and definition also helps to clarify this issue, and show how concepts can be held in common, even in the face of differing beliefs. For instance, wiki as a medium may permit such confusion but disciplined users can apply dispute resolution methods to sort out their conflicts. It is also argued that most people share a common set of "semantic primitives", fundamental concepts, to which they refer when they are trying to explain unfamiliar terms to other people. An ontology that includes representations of those semantic primitives could in such a case be used to create logical descriptions of any term that a person may wish to define logically. That ontology would be one form of upper ontology, serving as a logical "interlingua" that can translate ideas in one terminology to its logical equivalent in another terminology.

Advocates argue that most disagreement about the viability of an upper ontology can be traced to the conflation of ontology, language and knowledge, or too-specialized areas of knowledge: many people, or agents or groups will have areas of their respective internal ontologies that do not overlap. If they can cooperate and share a conceptual map at all, this may be so very useful that it outweighs any disadvantages that accrue from sharing. To the degree it becomes harder to share concepts the deeper one probes, the more valuable such sharing tends to get. If the problem is as basic as opponents of upper ontologies claim, then, it also applies to a group of humans trying to cooperate, who might need machine assistance to communicate easily.

If nothing else, such ontologies are implied by machine translation, used when people cannot practically communicate. Whether "upper" or not, these seem likely to proliferate.

== Table of formal upper ontologies ==
The following table contains data mainly from "A Comparison of Upper Ontologies" article by V Mascardi, V Cordi and P Rosso (2007).

Name	Initial release	Last release	Developer	Focus	License	URLs	Metrics	Distinguishing features	Versions
Sowa's Ontology	1999	1999	John F. Sowa	Logical, Philosophical, and Computational Foundations	free	Sowa's UO,	30 classes, 5 relations, 30 axioms	Logical elegance, compact	
Cyc	1984	version 6.1 at 2017.11.27	Cycorp company (from 1994)	everyday common sense knowledge, with the goal of enabling AI applications to perform human-like reasoning	proprietary	cyc.com	300,000 concepts, 3,000,000 assertions (facts and rules), 15,000 relations	12,000 WordNet synsets, huge	OpenCyc, ResearchCyc
YAMATO	1999	2012.07.14	Dr.Riichiro Mizoguchi	Quality and Quantity, Representations (content-bearing things), Objects, Processes and Events	?	YAMATO	?	Role concepts	
BFO	2002	BF0 2020 ISO/IEC 21838-2	Barry Smith et al.	Top-level ontology to promote interoperability of domain ontologies	BSD License	basic-formal-ontology.org	34 categories, 8 relations; formalizations in OWL, CLIF, OBO and Isabel formats	very large established user base; thorough documentation	Version 2.0
gist	2007	Version 14.1.0 at 2026	Semantic Arts, Inc.	Minimalist upper ontology, for enterprises information systems	CC BY 4.0	www.semanticarts.com/gist/	97 classes, 116 properties, 19 root classes, 1587 axioms	Oriented toward practical business applications, uses everyday concepts. Basis for about a dozen major enterprise ontologies	
BORO	late 1980s and early 1990s		A team of KPMG consultants led by Chris Partridge	An extensional (and hence, four-dimensional) ontology which provides it a simple criteria of identity.		www.borosolutions.net		It is built upon a series of clear metaphysical choices to provide a solid (metaphysical) foundation.	
GFO	1999	2008 (in progress)	Heinrich Herre	Including many aspects of recent philosophy	Open	www.onto-med.de/ontologies/gfo	2008	Its account of persistence and its time model.	gfo.owl and gfo-basic.owl
IDEAS			IDEAS Group	Is higher-order, extensional and 4D. developed using the BORO Method.				The IDEAS ontology is not intended for reasoning and inference purposes; its purpose is to be a precise model of business.	
ISO 15926	2003		EPISTLE - European Process Industries STEP Technical Liaison Executive	The representation of process plant life-cycle information. Generic enough to cover any facility, if a suitable reference data library is available.	Free to use	www.iso.org/standard/29557.html	A generic model with 201 entity types. Reference data library covers 40,000 concepts, user-extendable.	To enable integration of life-cycle information the model is 4D and excludes all information constraints that are appropriate only to particular applications within the scope.	ISO 15926-2:2003
SUMO	2000	v1.1 - ontologyportal.org/SUMOhistory/SUMO1.1.txt	IEEE working group P1600.1	For research and applications in search, linguistics and reasoning.	Open source.	www.ontologyportal.org	Total Terms:13457, Total Axioms:193812, Total Rules:6055	The largest formal public ontology in existence today. Has been mapped to all of the WordNet lexicon.	2024- github.com/ontologyportal/sumo
UMBEL	2008	version 1.50 at 2016	Structured Dynamics	Relating information from disparate sources to one another.	CC by 3.0		About 35,000 reference concepts	Designed to provide common mapping points for relating different ontologies or schema to one another,	UMBEL 1.50
WordNet	mid 1980s	Version 3.1 at 2011	Princeton University	A semantic network based on psycholinguistic principles,	BSD-like	wordnet.princeton.edu	155 327 words organized in 175 979 synsets for a total of 207 016 word-sense pairs;	Not axiomatically precise. Used in Natural language processing research.	Version 3.1

== Available upper ontologies ==
=== Basic Formal Ontology (BFO) ===
The Basic Formal Ontology (BFO) framework developed by Barry Smith and his associates consists of a series of sub-ontologies at different levels of granularity. The ontologies are divided into two varieties: relating to continuant entities such as three-dimensional enduring objects, and occurrent entities (primarily) processes conceived as unfolding in successive phases through time. BFO thus incorporates both three-dimensionalist and four-dimensionalist perspectives on reality within a single framework. Interrelations are defined between the two types of ontologies in a way which gives BFO the facility to deal with both static/spatial and dynamic/temporal features of reality. A continuant domain ontology descending from BFO can be conceived as an inventory of entities existing at a time. Each occurrent ontology can be conceived as an inventory of processes unfolding through a given interval of time. Both BFO itself and each of its extension sub-ontologies can be conceived as a window on a certain portion of reality at a given level of granularity. The more than 350 ontology frameworks based on BFO are catalogued on the BFO website. These apply the BFO architecture to different domains through the strategy of downward population. The Cell Ontology, for example, populates downward from BFO by importing the BFO branch terminating with object, and defining a cell as a subkind of object. Other examples of ontologies extending BFO are the Ontology for Biomedical Investigations (OBI) and other the ontologies of the Open Biomedical Ontologies Foundry. In addition to these examples, BFO and extensions are increasingly being used in defense and security domains, for example in the Common Core Ontology framework. BFO also serves as the upper level of the Sustainable Development Goals (SDG) Interface Ontology developed by the United Nations Environment Programme, and of the Industrial Ontologies Foundry (IOF) initiative of the manufacturing industry. BFO has been documented in the textbook Building Ontologies with Basic Formal Ontology, published by MIT Press in 2015.

=== BORO ===
Business Objects Reference Ontology is an upper ontology designed for developing ontological or semantic models for large complex operational applications that consists of a top ontology as well as a process for constructing the ontology. It is built upon a series of clear metaphysical choices to provide a solid (metaphysical) foundation. A key choice was for an extensional (and hence, four-dimensional) ontology which provides it a simple criteria of identity. Elements of it have appeared in a number of standards. For example, the ISO standard, ISO 15926 – Industrial automation systems and integration – was heavily influenced by an early version. The IDEAS (International Defence Enterprise Architecture Specification for exchange) standard is based upon BORO, which in turn was used to develop DODAF 2.0.

=== CIDOC Conceptual Reference Model ===
Although "CIDOC object-oriented Conceptual Reference Model" (CRM) is a domain ontology, specialised to the purposes of representing cultural heritage, a subset called CRM Core is a generic upper ontology, including:

- Space-Time – title/identifier, place, era/period, time-span, relationship to persistent items
- Events – title/identifier, beginning/ending of existence, participants (people, either individually or in groups), creation/modification of things (physical or conceptional), relationship to persistent items
- Material Things – title/identifier, place, the information object the material thing carries, part-of relationships, relationship to persistent items
- Immaterial Things – title/identifier, information objects (propositional or symbolic), conceptional things, part-of relationships

A persistent item is a physical or conceptional item that has a persistent identity recognized within the duration of its existence by its identification rather than by its continuity or by observation. A persistent item is comparable to an endurant.
A propositional object is a set of statements about real or imaginary things.
A symbolic object is a sign/symbol or an aggregation of signs or symbols.

=== COSMO ===
COSMO (COmmon Semantic MOdel) is an ontology that was initiated as a project of the COSMO working group of the Ontology and taxonomy Coordinating Working Group, with the goal of developing a foundation ontology that can serve to enable broad general Semantic Interoperability. The current version is an OWL ontology, but a Common-Logic compliant version is anticipated in the future. The ontology and explanatory files are available at the COSMO site. The goal of the COSMO working group was to develop a foundation ontology by a collaborative process that will allow it to represent all of the basic ontology elements that all members feel are needed for their applications. The development of COSMO is fully open, and any comments or suggestions from any sources are welcome. After some discussion and input from members in 2006, the development of the COSMO has been continued primarily by Patrick Cassidy, the chairman of the COSMO Working Group. Contributions and suggestions from any interested party are still welcome and encouraged. Many of the types (OWL classes) in the current COSMO have been taken from the OpenCyc OWL version 0.78, and from the SUMO. Other elements were taken from other ontologies (such as BFO and DOLCE), or developed specifically for COSMO. Development of the COSMO initially focused on including representations of all of the words in the Longman Dictionary of Contemporary English (LDOCE) controlled defining vocabulary (2148 words). These words are sufficient to define (linguistically) all of the entries in the LDOCE. It is hypothesized that the ontological representations of the concepts represented by those terms will be sufficient to specify the meanings of any specialized ontology element, thereby serving as a basis for general Semantic Interoperability. Interoperability via COSMO is enabled by using the COSMO (or an ontology derived from it) as an interlingua by which other domain ontologies can be translated into each other's terms and thereby accurately communicate. As new domains are linked into COSMO, additional semantic primitives may be recognized and added to its structure. The current (January 2021) OWL version of COSMO has over 24000 types (OWL classes), over 1350 relations, and over 21000 restrictions. The COSMO itself (COSMO.owl) and other related and explanatory files can be obtained at the link for COSMO in the External Links section below.

=== Cyc ===
Cyc is a proprietary system, under development since 1986, consisting of a foundation ontology and several domain-specific ontologies (called microtheories). A subset of those ontologies was released for free under the name OpenCyc in 2002 and was available until circa 2016. A subset of Cyc called ResearchCyc was made available for free non-commercial research use in 2006.

=== DOLCE ===
Descriptive Ontology for Linguistic and Cognitive Engineering (DOLCE) is a foundational ontology designed in 2002 in the context of the WonderWeb EU project, developed by Nicola Guarino and his associates at the Laboratory for Applied Ontology (LOA). As implied by its acronym, DOLCE is oriented toward capturing the ontological categories underlying natural language and human common sense. DOLCE, however, does not commit to a strictly referentialist metaphysics related to the intrinsic nature of the world. Rather, the categories it introduces are thought of as cognitive artifacts, which are ultimately depending on human perception, cultural imprints, and social conventions. In this sense, they intend to be just descriptive (vs prescriptive) notions, which support the formal specification of domain conceptualizations.

DOLCE-Ultralite, designed by Aldo Gangemi and colleagues at the Semantic Technology Lab of National Research Council (Italy) is the Web Ontology Language (OWL) version of DOLCE. It simplifies some modal axioms of DOLCE, and extends it to cover the Descriptions and Situations framework, also designed in the WonderWeb project. DOLCE-Ultralite is the source of some core ontology design patterns, and is widely adopted in ontology projects worldwide.

=== General Formal Ontology (GFO) ===
The general formal ontology (GFO), developed by Heinrich Herre and his colleagues of the research group Onto-Med in Leipzig, is a realistic ontology integrating processes and objects. It attempts to include many aspects of recent philosophy, which is reflected both in its taxonomic tree and its axiomatizations. GFO allows for different axiomatizations of its categories (such as the existence of atomic time-intervals vs. dense time). The basic principles of GFO are published in the Onto-Med Report Nr. 8 and in "General Formal Ontology (GFO): A Foundational Ontology for Conceptual Modelling".

Two GFO specialties, among others, are its account of persistence and its time model. Regarding persistence, the distinction between endurants (objects) and perdurants (processes) is made explicit within GFO by the introduction of a special category, a persistent. A persistent is a special category with the intention that its instances "remain identical" (over time). With respect to time, time intervals are taken as primitive in GFO, and time-points (called "time boundaries") as derived. Moreover, time-points may coincide, which is convenient for modelling instantaneous changes.

=== gist ===
gist is developed and supported by Semantic Arts. gist (not an acronym – it means to get the essence of) is a "minimalist upper ontology". gist is targeted at enterprise information systems, although it has been applied to healthcare delivery applications.

gist has been used to build enterprise ontologies for a number of major commercial and governmental agencies including: Procter & Gamble, Sentara Healthcare, Washington State Department of Labor & Industries, LexisNexis, Sallie Mae and two major Financial Services firms. gist is freely available with a Creative Commons share alike license. gist is actively maintained, and has been in use for over 15 years. As of April 2026 it is at version 14.1.0.

gist was the subject of a paper exploring how to bridge modeling differences between ontologies. In a paper describing the OQuaRE methodology for evaluating ontologies, the gist unit of measure ontology (at that time, a separate module) scored the highest in the manual evaluation against 10 other unit of measure ontologies, and scored above average in the automated evaluation. The authors stated: "This ontology could easily be tested and validated, its knowledge could be effectively reused and adapted for different specified environments".

=== ISO 15926 ===
ISO 15926 is an International Standard for the representation of process plant life-cycle information. This representation is specified by a generic, conceptual data model that is suitable as the basis for implementation in a shared database or data warehouse. The data model is designed to be used in conjunction with reference data: standard instances that represent information common to a number of users, process plants, or both. The support for a specific life-cycle activity depends on the use of appropriate reference data in conjunction with the data model. To enable integration of life-cycle information the model excludes all information constraints that are appropriate only to particular applications within the scope. ISO 15926-2 defines a generic model with 201 entity types. It has been prepared by Technical Committee ISO/TC 184, Industrial automation systems and integration, Subcommittee SC 4, Industrial data.

=== SUMO (Suggested Upper Merged Ontology) ===
The Suggested Upper Merged Ontology (SUMO) is another comprehensive ontology project. It includes an upper ontology, created by the IEEE working group P1600.1 (originally by Ian Niles and Adam Pease). It is extended with many domain ontologies and a complete set of links to WordNet. It is open source.

=== UMBEL ===
Upper Mapping and Binding Exchange Layer (UMBEL) is an ontology of 28,000 reference concepts that maps to a simplified subset of the OpenCyc ontology, that is intended to provide a way of linking the precise OpenCyc ontology with less formal ontologies. It also has formal mappings to Wikipedia, DBpedia, PROTON and GeoNames. It has been developed and maintained as open source by Structured Dynamics.

=== WordNet ===
WordNet, a freely available database originally designed as a semantic network based on psycholinguistic principles, was expanded by addition of definitions and is now also viewed as a dictionary. It qualifies as an upper ontology by including the most general concepts as well as more specialized concepts, related to each other not only by the subsumption relations, but by other semantic relations as well, such as part-of and cause. However, unlike Cyc, it has not been formally axiomatized so as to make the logical relations between the concepts precise. It has been widely used in Natural language processing research.

=== YAMATO (Yet Another More Advanced Top Ontology) ===
YAMATO is developed by Riichiro Mizoguchi, formerly at the Institute of Scientific and Industrial Research of the University of Osaka, and now at the Japan Advanced Institute of Science and Technology. Major features of YAMATO are:

1. an advanced description of quality, attribute, property, and quantity,
2. an ontology of representation,
3. an advanced description of processes and events,
4. the use of a theory of roles.

YAMATO has been extensively used for developing other, more applied, ontologies such as a medical ontology, an ontology of gene, an ontology of learning/instructional theories, an ontology of sustainability science, and an ontology of the cultural domain.

== See also ==
- Authority control
- Commonsense knowledge
- Core ontology
- Formal ontology
- Foundations of mathematics
- Knowledge Organization Systems
- Library classification
- Ontology (information science)
- Physical ontology
- Process ontology
- Semantic interoperability
