= Modern Era Basic Persons =

Austrian Academy of Sciences database

The Modern Era Basic Persons (PMB) is a web service of the Austrian Academy of Sciences that compiles datasets on individuals, places, works, institutions, and events with a focus on Young Vienna, the Austrian Fin de Siècle, and Vienna in the period from 1900 to 1938. The PMB was published in 2018 by the Austrian Centre for Digital Humanities and Cultural Heritage (ACDH-CH) and is continuously being expanded. Currently, it lists about 70,000 entities, mainly from the circles of Arthur Schnitzler, Karl Kraus, and Hermann Bahr.

== Database ==
The PMB is based on the Austrian Prosopographical Information System (APIS), a relational database developed at ACDH-CH for the Austrian Biographical Lexicon 1815–1950. It records data on individuals, places, works, institutions, and events generated in humanities research projects about Vienna around 1900. The entities can be related to each other, allowing for the capture of family relationships, birth and death dates, and attendees at an event at a specific location. Larger datasets come from the edition of Arthur Schnitzler's Diary, his Arthur Schnitzler's Correspondence, and the edition of Die Fackel. The PMB serves various Digital Humanities projects as a unifying authority file and is enriched with Linked Open Data from other authority datasets (e.g., from Wikidata, GeoNames, and the GND) as well as with links to digital texts. The data can be downloaded individually as JSON files or as TEI files. Complete lists are also available for download.

== Projects ==
Projects whose data are listed in the PMB:

- Arthur Schnitzler: Correspondence with Authors
- Arthur Schnitzler: Diary. 1879–1931
- Arthur Schnitzler: The Timeless is of the Shortest Duration. Interviews, Opinions, Protests 1891–1931. Ed. Martin Anton Müller. Göttingen, Wallstein 2023, ISBN 978-3-8353-5471-5 (Website, Publisher's presentation)
- Arthur Schnitzler: Readings
- Places of Stay of Arthur Schnitzler (1879–1931)
- Clara Katharina Pollaczek: Arthur Schnitzler and I
- Karl Kraus: Die Fackel
- Karl Kraus: Legal Records of the Oskar Samek Law Firm
- Austrian Biographical Lexicon (from birth year 1850)
- Hermann Bahr: Text Index

== Literature ==
- Müller, Martin Anton: A Wildly Gone Telephone Book in the Digital Age. In: Karl Kraus: Legal Records of the Oskar Samek Law Firm. Scientific edition ed. by Johannes Knüchel and Isabel Langkabel, based on the preliminary work of Katharina Prager, with the collaboration of Laura Untner, Andrea Ortner, Ingo Börner, and Vanessa Hannesschläger (Vienna 2022), online
