= CRCS =

CRCS may refer to:

- Cedar Rapids Community Schools
- CR Classification, now ACM Computing Classification System
- Certified Revenue Cycle Specialist
- César Ritz Colleges Switzerland
