= GFO =

GFO may refer to:

- Bartica Airport, in Guyana
- General formal ontology
- Geosat Follow-On, a satellite mission
- Glasgow Film Office
- Government Finance Office of the Government of Saskatchewan, Canada
