= OntoCAPE =

OntoCAPE is a large-scale ontology for the domain of Computer-Aided Process Engineering (CAPE). It can be downloaded free of charge via the OntoCAPE Homepage.

OntoCAPE is partitioned into 62 sub-ontologies, which can be used individually or as an integrated suite. The sub-ontologies are organized across different abstraction layers, which separate general knowledge from knowledge about particular domains and applications.

- The upper layers have the character of an upper ontology, covering general topics such as mereotopology, systems theory, quantities and units.
- The lower layers conceptualize the domain of chemical process engineering, covering domain-specific topics such as materials, chemical reactions, or unit operations.
