= People Cards =

Knowledge base used by Google in India

The Google People Cards was a knowledge base used by Google and its services to enhance its search engine's results with information gathered from people in India. After launching in India, Google launched this service in African countries, such as Kenya, Nigeria and South Africa. This service allows individuals to create their profile on Google's search engine.

However, on April 7, 2024, the Google People Cards feature and the ability to create new people cards or update existing ones was discontinued. Claiming this was not as helpful as was intended.
