= Penetration =

Penetration may refer to:

== Science and technology ==
- Passage through a partition or wall by a wire, cable, or other electrically conductive object
- Penetration (firestop), an opening in a wall or floor assembly required to have a fire-resistance rating, for the purpose of accommodating the passage of a mechanical, electrical, or structural penetrant
- Penetration (weapons), the ability to pierce the target's armor or other protection
- Penetration depth of light or any electromagnetic radiation in a physical medium
- Penetrating trauma, injury that occurs when an object pierces the skin and enters a tissue of the body
- In roofing, pipes, conduits, and HVAC supports passing through the room
- An unauthorized act of bypassing access control

== Arts and media ==
- Penetration (band), a punk rock band
- "Penetration", a song on Iggy and the Stooges' album Raw Power
- "Penetration", a song on Pedro the Lion's album Control
- "Penetration", a song by The Pyramids
- Body of Lies (film), a film formerly known as Penetration
- Penetration: The Question of Extraterrestrial and Human Telepathy, a 1998 book by Ingo Swann

== Other uses ==
- Penetration (warfare), the breaching of, and moving past, a defensive military line
- Market penetration or brand penetration, the degree to which a product or service is known and/or used
- Sexual penetration, or sexual intercourse
  - in some jurisdictions, a criminal charge related to various sexual offences
- In basketball, the ability of a player to drive through the opposition's defense
- In magic, an illusion in which one object appears to pass through another

== See also ==
- Penetrator (disambiguation)
- Interpenetration (disambiguation)
- 徹 (disambiguation)
