= Semantic Interoperability Community of Practice =

Semantic Interoperability Community of Practice (SICoP) is a group of people who seek to make the Semantic Web operational in their respective settings by achieving "semantic interoperability" and "semantic data integration".

SICoP seeks to enable Semantic Interoperability, specifically the "operationalizing" of relevant technologies and approaches, through online conversation, meetings, tutorials, conferences, pilot projects, and other activities aimed at developing and disseminating best practices.

The individuals making up this Community of Practice comes from various settings, however, the SICoP claims neither formal nor implied endorsement by any organization.
