= Interpenetration =

Interpenetration may refer to:

- Perfect Interpenetration is a key philosophical concept in East Asian Buddhism
- Interpenetration (Christianity), a term in Christian theology
- Interpenetration, in computer 3D modelling collision detection

== See also ==
- Impenetrability, that quality of matter whereby two bodies cannot occupy the same space at the same time
- Penetration (disambiguation)
