= American Art Collaborative =

Consortium of U.S. art museums working on linked open data

- Abbreviation: AAC
- Established: 2014 (11 years ago)
- Website: americanartcollaborative.org

The American Art Collaborative (AAC) is a consortium of 14 art museums in the United States, whose mission is the establishment of "a critical mass of linked open data (LOD) on the semantic web."

As of 2024, the AAC has converted over 230,000 museum object records to linked open data.

== Membership ==
As of 2024, the 14 members are:

- Amon Carter Museum of American Art
- Archives of American Art, Smithsonian Institution
- Autry Museum of the American West
- Colby College Museum of Art
- Crystal Bridges Museum of American Art
- Dallas Museum of Art (DMA)
- Indianapolis Museum of Art (IMA)
- Thomas Gilcrease Institute of American History and Art
- National Portrait Gallery, Smithsonian Institution
- National Museum of Wildlife Art
- Princeton University Art Museum
- Smithsonian American Art Museum
- Walters Art Museum
- Yale Center for British Art
