= IDEAS Group =

Working group for military enterprise architectures

The International Defence Enterprise Architecture Specification for exchange Group (IDEAS Group) is a project involving four nations (plus NATO as observers) and covering MODAF (UK), DoDAF (US), DNDAF (Canada) and the Australian Defence Architecture Framework (AUSDAF). The deliverable of the project is a data exchange format for military Enterprise Architectures. The initial scope for exchange is the architectural data required to support coalition operations planning, including:

- Systems – communications systems, networks, software applications, etc.
- Communications links between systems
- Information specifications – the types of information (and their security classifications) that the comms architecture will handle
- Platforms and facilities
- System and operational functions (activities)
- People and organizations
- Architecture meta-data – who owns it, who was the architect, name, version, description, etc.

The work has begun with the development of a formal ontology to specify the data exchange semantics. The W3C Resource Description Framework (RDF) and Web Ontology Language (OWL) will be the format used for data exchange. A demonstration of multinational interoperability is scheduled for September 2007, based on exchanging process models for casualty tracking.

== The Need for Architecture Interoperability ==
The need for IDEAS was identified in 2005 by the Australian, Canadian, UK and US defence departments. The main purpose of IDEAS is to support coalition military operations planning. The ability to exchange architectures between countries enables better understanding of each other's capabilities, communications mechanisms and standard procedures.

== Military Application ==
- Sharing of standard operating procedures and doctrine. Each nation has its own operating procedures, which are usually represented in process models (e.g. a DoDAF OV-5 Product). An ability to share these processes between partner nations enables better understanding and more efficient joint operations.
- Sharing of systems information. The nations generally use different communications systems, weapon systems and platforms. An ability to share technical information (within classification limits) enables better understanding of how partner nations' systems communicate and function. This allows for better orchestration of sensors and effects across the coalition.
- Change management. The procurement cycles in each of the nations are generally not coordinated with each other. The ability to share future systems' information amongst partner nations allows for better forward planning.
- Identification of system options. In planning a coalition operation, it is useful for the planner to have an accurate picture of each nation's capability contribution. This allows for selection of the best capability, and reduction in redundancy and start-up effort.
- Identification of network configuration. It is important for each nation to have an understanding of the comms laydown for an operation. An ability to provide each nation with the same understanding of the comms structure means there is less re-work and less opportunity for gaps in understanding between the nations.
- Assessment of Relative Performance. IDEAS will enable exchange of complete Enterprise Architecture models, potentially allowing simulation of capability prior to operational commitment.
- Force Structures. Coalition nations will be able to share organisational structures and orders of battle with partners (again, subject to issues of security classification).

== Ontology ==
IDEAS is a formal, higher-order, 4D (see four dimensionalism) ontology. It is extensional (see Extension (metaphysics)), using physical existence as its criterion for identity. In practical terms, this means the ontology is well suited to managing change over time and identifying elements with a degree of precision that is not possible using names alone.

The ontology is being built using the BORO Method which has proven useful for the multidisciplinary team working on IDEAS. BORO forces the ontology developer to consider each concept in terms of its physical extent. This means there can be no argument about names or meaning—something either exists or it doesn't. The BORO Method also deals with classes and relationships by tracing them back to their members (classes) or ends (relationships).

The concepts specified in IDEAS and the BORO Method have also been employed in the Information Exchange Standard in UK Government.

== Implementation ==
To date, there have been three IDEAS implementations:

- IDEAS Ontology Development Plug-in for Sparx Systems – Enterprise Architect. The prototype was developed by Model Futures and is published on GitHub
- An OV-5 export interface for Telelogic System Architect. The interface was developed by Silver Bullet inc. under contract to the DoD
- An OV-5 import/export interface for Sparx Enterprise Architect developed by Model Futures for MOD (under subcontract to Serco Consulting)
- The MOD Ontology Demonstrator – used the IDEAS model to demonstrate a simple geopolitical ontology. It can be downloaded from modaf.com
- The UK MOD AV-2 demonstrator – implemented a shared ontology based on IDEAS that is used to populate AV-2 in MODAF

== IDEAS Publications & Presentations ==
The IDEAS work has been presented at a number of conferences. It has also been cited in a Cutter Consortium white paper and in a book on Systems Engineering from Springer Verlag.
