= Impenetrability =

Imperviousness to penetration

In metaphysics, impenetrability is the name given to that quality of matter whereby two bodies cannot occupy the same space at the same time. The philosopher John Toland argued that impenetrability and extension were sufficient to define matter, a contention strongly disputed by Gottfried Wilhelm von Leibniz.

Locke considered impenetrability to be "more a consequence of solidity, than solidity itself."

== See also ==
- Locke's views on extension
- Interpenetration (disambiguation)
