= Bio2RDF =

Content
- Description: Bio2RDF

Contact
- Research center: Laval University
- Laboratory: Centre de Recherche du CHUL,
- Authors: François Belleau
- Primary citation: PMID 18472304
- Release date: 2008

Access
- Website: http://bio2rdf.org

Bio2RDF is a biological database that uses semantic web technologies to provide interlinked life science data.

== History ==
In its first form, described in 2008, Bio2RDF provided an RDF warehouse of human and mouse genome data with resources identified by URIs normalized around the bio2rdf.org namespace. A second coordinated release in January 2013 expanded coverage to 19 resources with over one billion triples and added mappings to the Semanticscience Integrated Ontology which allowed ontology-based querying of the data.

The third coordinated release in July 2014, comprised about 11 billion triples across 30 datasets, ten of them new, which the authors described as a tenfold increase over release 2. The largest datasets were PubMed (about 5 billion triples), iProClass (about 3 billion) and NCBI Gene (about 1 billion). The release added clinically relevant datasets, extended dataset statistics and a refactored linked data platform.

== Technology ==
Bio2RDF scripts convert heterogeneously formatted data, such as flat files, tab-delimited files, SQL databases and XML into RDF. Entities are identified by URIs that can be resolved through a web application which answers requests by running SPARQL queries against the appropriate endpoints. Because releases are numbered, a dataset can be cited as a specific version in a scientific article.

== See also ==
- DBpedia
- RDF
- Semantic web
