= PhySH =

PhySH, an abbreviation for Physics Subject Headings, is a classification scheme developed by the American Physical Society (APS) as a universal classification scheme covering all branches of physics including astronomy, quantum computation, and physics education. This scheme was unveiled in January 2016. It substitutes the previous Physics and Astronomy Classification Scheme (PACS) of the American Institute of Physics (AIP) and is currently the working tool for all journals of APS and all scientific Conferences and Meetings called by APS.

== Brief history ==
PACS was created by AIP in the 1970s. AIP maintained and updated it until 2010, when AIP decided to keep PACS 2010 as its final version because of the inherent limitations to the PACS system. Under these conditions, and confronted with the necessity to operate an efficient classification system well-accommodated to fast developments in various branches of physics, APS developed its own PhySH system. The development of PhySH started in 2012, and it has been unveiled in January 2016. Being word based, i.e., operating with regular English words rather than formal PACS codes, PhySH is much more intuitive than PACS. Also, new concepts originating in the course of the development of science can be organically incorporated into PhySH which creates a basis for its further development. Perpetual development is the idea laid into the basis of PhySH system which is expected to become the internationally recognized standard.

== Basics of PhySH ==
PhySH is based on three principal definitions: Disciplines, Facets, and Concepts. Their meaning can be best understood by browsing the PhySH webpage. There are currently 17 disciplines, from Accelerators & Beams, through Biological Physics and Networks, to Statistical Physics. Five facets include Research Areas, Physical Systems, Properties, Techniques, and Professional topics. Clicking on them opens lists of related concepts. Using the Search option for a specific term opens a string, or a set of strings, each of them beginning with the related facet that is followed by a set of concepts, beginning from broader and going to more specific. E.g., searching for Van der Waals results in three strings. One of them reads as:

Physical systems > 3-dimensional systems > Complex materials > Heterostructures > Van der Waals heterostructures

Such architecture of PhySH allows its easy extension, and PhySH is considered as a permanently developing rather than finished project. Authors of papers submitted to American physical journals are encouraged to provide editors with PhySH terms to assist in choosing proper reviewers, and some journals even require providing PhySH terms. PhySH is expected to expand with the growth of physics, and this should happen technically through the input coming from authors, reviewers, editors, and organizers of scientific conferences.

== See also ==
- Physics and Astronomy Classification Scheme (PACS)
- Computing Classification System (CCS)
- Mathematics Subject Classification (MSC)
