= Core ontology =

In philosophy, a core ontology is a basic and minimal ontology consisting only of the minimal concepts required to understand the other concepts. It must be based on a core glossary in some human language so humans can comprehend the concepts and distinctions made. Each natural language tends to rely on its own conceptual metaphor structure, and so tends to have its own core ontology (according to W. V. Quine). It could be said also to represent the moral core of a human linguistic culture, and to self-correct so as to better represent core cultural ideas.

Such a core ontology is a key pre-requisite to a more complete foundation ontology, or a more general philosophical sense of ontology. Most applicable to teaching, e.g. the Longmans defining dictionary of the simplest meanings of 2,000 English words is used to define the 4,000 most basic English idioms—this is a core glossary of the English language, which permits access to the core ontology (the idioms).

Core ontology is a concept that is used in information science as well. For example, CIDOC-CRM and CORA are considered as core ontologies.

== See also ==
- Semantic prime
- Upper ontology
