= Penetrator =

Penetrator may refer to:

- A penetration fighter that operates at long range over enemy airspace, or the related bomber version
- Penetrator (album), a 1985 album by Ted Nugent
- Penetrator (video game), a 1982 Sinclair ZX video game
- Penetrator (play), a 1993 play by Anthony Neilson
- Kinetic energy penetrator, an anti-tank munition
- Interstate 194 (Michigan), a freeway whose semi-official nickname is The Penetrator

== See also ==
- Ultra-Efficient Products Penetrater, a 1980s American ultralight aircraft
