= YAGO (database) =

Open-source information repository

- Developer: Max-Planck-Institute Saarbrücken
- Release: 2008
- Stable release: 4.5 / May 2023
- Type: Semantic Web, linked data
- License: Creative Commons CC-BY 4.0
- Website: yago-knowledge.org
- Repository: github.com/yago-naga/yago-4.5

YAGO (Yet Another Great Ontology) is an open source knowledge base developed at the Max Planck Institute for Informatics in Saarbrücken. It is automatically extracted from Wikidata and Schema.org.

YAGO4, which was released in 2020, combines data that was extracted from Wikidata with relationship designators from Schema.org. The previous version of YAGO, YAGO3, had knowledge of more than 10 million entities and contained more than 120 million facts about these entities. The information in YAGO3 was extracted from Wikipedia (e.g., categories, redirects, infoboxes), WordNet (e.g., synsets, hyponymy), and GeoNames. The accuracy of YAGO was manually evaluated to be above 95% on a sample of facts. To integrate it to the linked data cloud, YAGO has been linked to the DBpedia ontology and to the SUMO ontology.

YAGO3 is provided in Turtle and tsv formats. Dumps of the whole database are available, as well as thematic and specialized dumps. It can also be queried through various online browsers and through a SPARQL endpoint hosted by OpenLink Software. The source code of YAGO3 is available on GitHub.

YAGO has been used in the Watson artificial intelligence system.

== See also ==
- Commonsense knowledge bases
- Cyc
- Evi (software)
- DBpedia
