= ACM Computing Classification System =

Classification system for computer science topics

The ACM Computing Classification System (CCS) is a subject classification system for computing devised by the Association for Computing Machinery (ACM). The system is comparable to the Mathematics Subject Classification (MSC) in scope, aims, and structure, being used by the various ACM journals to organize subjects by area.

== History ==
The system has gone through seven revisions, the first version being published in 1964, and revised versions appearing in 1982, 1983, 1987, 1991, 1998, and the now current version in 2012.

== Structure ==
It is hierarchically structured in four levels. For example, one branch of the hierarchy contains:

Computing methodologies

Artificial intelligence

Knowledge representation and reasoning

Ontology engineering

== See also ==
- Computer Science Ontology
- Physics and Astronomy Classification Scheme
- arXiv, a preprint server allowing submitted papers to be classified using the ACM CCS
- Physics Subject Headings
