= General formal ontology =

The General Formal Ontology (GFO) is an upper ontology integrating processes and objects. GFO has been developed by Heinrich Herre, Barbara Heller and collaborators (research group Onto-Med) in Leipzig. Although GFO provides one taxonomic tree, different axiom systems may be chosen for its modules. In this sense, GFO provides a framework for building custom, domain-specific ontologies. GFO exhibits a three-layered meta-ontological architecture consisting of an abstract top level, an abstract core level, and a basic level. Primarily, the ontology GFO:

- includes objects as well as processes and both are integrated into one coherent system,
- includes levels of reality,
- is designed to support interoperability by principles of ontological mapping and reduction,
- contains several novel ontological modules, in particular, a module for functions and a module for roles, and
- is designed for applications, firstly in medical, biological, and biomedical areas, but also in the fields of economics and sociology.

== Taxonomic tree of GFO ==
Basic taxonomic tree of the General Formal Ontology

GFO (General Formal ontology) draws a fundamental distinction between concrete entities, categories and sets. Sets are described by an axiomatic fragment of set theory of Zermelo-Fraenkel, although fragments of anti-foundation axiom set theories such as ZF-AFA are considered.

Concrete entities are entities which are in time and space, while categories have universal character.

== Categories ==
The common property of all categories is that they can be predicated of an entity.

Categories in GFO are further divided in immanent universals, conceptual structures and symbolic structures. Immanent universals are so-called Aristotelian universals, in the sense that they are considered in re. This means, that these universals exist in all the entities which instantiate an immanent universal, independent of an observer. An example of an immanent universal could be APPLE. The universal APPLE exists in all apples, independent of perception by an agent.

Conceptual structures are mental representations of entities or universals, and they exist in an agent's mind. For example, the individual representation of the (linguistic) term "apple" inside an agent's mind (determined by the agent's experience, knowledge and belief, etc.).

Symbolic structures are signs which may be instantiated by tokens. They have the property to stand for something beyond themselves. An example is the physical pattern "apple", which instantiates the "APPLE" symbolic structure.

== Space and time ==
GFO uses a theory of space and time which is inspired by the philosophy of Brentano. For time, time-intervals, called chronoids, are taken as primitive. Existentially dependent on these time-intervals are time-boundaries. Time-boundaries of different time-intervals may coincide. This notion of coincidence is equivalent to a formalization of time-based on the meets relation (due to Allen and Hayes).

Connected three-dimensional parts of space are called "topoids". As chronoids, topoids may coincide at a two-dimensional boundary. This boundary may coincide with other (two-dimensional) boundaries at a one-dimensional boundary, and so on.

== Processes and objects ==
GFO distinguishes processes and objects. Processes unfold in time, they have temporal parts. Objects (called presentials) have no temporal parts, and may only exist on time-boundaries. Presentials are dependent on processes. This can be seen as a derivation of the dependency-relations in the formalization of time: processes are always framed by a chronoid; and as time-boundaries are dependent on chronoids, so are presentials dependent on processes.

DOLCE and other ontologies face the problem of "identity": how is it possible to model the persistence of an object through time. In GFO, this problem is made explicit: all presentials explicitly exist only at a single time-boundary; persistence is modelled by a special type of category, a persistent.

== See also ==
- Formal ontology
- Upper ontology
