= Extension (metaphysics) =

Property of stretching out or taking up space

In metaphysics, extension signifies both 'stretching out' (Latin: extensio) as well as later 'taking up space', and most recently, spreading one's internal mental cognition into the external world.

The history of thinking about extension can be traced back at least to Archytas' spear analogy for the infinity of space. How far can one's hand or spear stretch out until it reaches the edge of reality? "If I arrived at the outermost edge of the heaven, could I extend my hand or staff into what is outside or not? It would be paradoxical [given our normal assumptions about the nature of space] not to be able to extend it."

== History ==
=== Descartes ===
René Descartes defined extension as the property of existing in more than one dimension, a property that was later followed up in Grassmann's n-dimensional algebra. For Descartes, the primary characteristic of matter is extension (res extensa), just as the primary characteristic of mind is thought (res cogitans).

=== Newton ===
After rejecting Cartesian identification of body with extension, Newton turns to the question of what the nature of the "immobile being"—space or extension itself, distinguished from body—was. He raises three possible definitions for extension: as a kind of substance; or as a kind of accident (a standard philosophical term for attribute: anything that can be predicated of substance); or "simply nothing" (a reference to atomism), all of which he repudiates. Instead he proposes that extension "has a certain mode of existence of its own, which agrees neither with substances nor accidents." After struggling with this question, Newton provides perhaps one of the clearest definitions of extension:

If we say with Descartes that extension is body, do we not manifestly offer a path to Atheism, both because extension is not a creature but has existed eternally, and because we have an absolute Idea of it without any relationship to God, and therefore we are able to conceive of it as existent while feigning the non-existence of God?

This leads Stein to conclude Newton's conception of Space, the existence of space, or extension, follows from that of anything whatsoever, but that extension does not require a subject in which it "inheres", as a property, and it can be conceived as existent without presupposing any particular thing, God included. On the other hand, it is an "affection of every being."

=== Locke ===
John Locke, in An Essay Concerning Human Understanding, defined extension as "only the Space that lies between the Extremities of those solid coherent Parts" of a body. It is the space possessed by a body. Locke refers to the extension in conjunction with solidity and impenetrability, the other primary characteristics of matter.

=== Spinoza ===
Extension also plays an important part in the philosophy of Baruch Spinoza, who says that substance (that which has extension) can be limited only by substance of the same sort, i.e. matter cannot be limited by ideas and vice versa. From this principle, he determines that substance is infinite. This infinite substance is what Spinoza calls God, or better yet nature, and it possesses both unlimited extension and unlimited consciousness.

== Infinite divisibility ==
Infinite divisibility refers to the idea that extension, or quantity, when divided and further divided infinitely, cannot reach the point of zero quantity. It can be divided into very small or negligible quantity but not zero or no quantity at all. Using a mathematical approach, specifically geometric models, Gottfried Leibniz and Descartes discussed the infinite divisibility of extension. Actual divisibility may be limited due to unavailability of cutting instruments, but its possibility of breaking into smaller pieces is infinite.

== Compenetration ==
Compenetration refers to two or more extensions occupying the same space at the same time. This, according to scholastic philosophers, is impossible; according to this view, only spirits or spiritualized matter can occupy a place occupied already by an entity (matter or spirit)

== Extended mind thesis ==
In more recent work, philosophers David Chalmers and Andy Clark in 1998 published "The Extended Mind." This has opened a wide channel of new research at the nexus of epistemology, philosophy of mind, cognitive and neuro-science, dynamic systems thinking, science, technology & innovation studies.

== See also ==
- Mass
- Mass generation
- Higgs mechanism
