= List of SPARQL implementations =

This list shows notable triplestores, APIs, and other storage engines that have implemented the W3C SPARQL standard.

- Amazon Neptune
- Apache Marmotta (retired in November 2020)
- AllegroGraph
- Eclipse RDF4J
- Apache Jena with ARQ
- Blazegraph (no new development since November 2022)
- Corese (archived since Jan 28, 2025)
- Cray Urika-GD
- Comunica
- IBM Db2 - Removed in v11.5.
- KAON2
- MarkLogic
- Mulgara
- NitrosBase
- Ontop
- Ontotext GraphDB
- Oracle DB Enterprise Spatial & Graph
- Oxigraph
- RDFLib Python library
- Redland / Redstore
- Stardog
- TinySPARQL part of the GNOME Project
- QLever
- Virtuoso

== See also ==
- Comparison of structured storage software
- Graph database § List of graph databases
