= QLever =

SPARQL engine

- Original authors: Hannah Bast, Björn Buchhold, Johannes Kalmbach, et al.
- Release: 2017; 9 years ago
- Written in: C++
- Standard: SPARQL
- Available in: English
- Type: Graph database
- License: Apache License
- Website: qlever.dev
- Repository: github.com/ad-freiburg/qlever

QLever (pronounced /ˈklɛvər/ KLEH-ver, as in "clever") is an open-source triplestore, graph database and SPARQL engine. It is designed to efficiently load and query very large RDF datasets, including those with hundreds of billions of triples on a single commodity server. Unlike many large-scale graph databases that rely on distributed clusters, QLever is designed to operate efficiently on a single machine with modest memory requirements, even with very large datasets. QLever implements the full SPARQL 1.1 standard, including SPARQL Update, for read/write operations.

Beyond standard RDF graph queries, QLever integrates full-text search directly within SPARQL, allowing queries to combine structured semantic web knowledge-base lookups with keyword search over text corpuses. It also supports spatial queries via the GeoSPARQL standard, enabling geometric operations over spatial datasets such as OpenStreetMap. A context-sensitive autocomplete interface for QLever supports users in creating SPARQL queries interactively.

== History ==
QLever was first described in a 2017 paper by Hannah Bast and Björn Buchhold of the University of Freiburg. The paper introduced QLever's approach of combining SPARQL with full-text search and demonstrated performance advantages over contemporary SPARQL engines. Development originated at the Chair for Algorithms and Data Structures at the University of Freiburg.

In 2021, the team published work on efficient RDF conversion and querying of the complete OpenStreetMap dataset, introducing support for GeoSPARQL queries over the full OSM data. A 2022 paper introduced the context-sensitive SPARQL auto-completion system.

A 2023 study compared QLever with Virtuoso, Blazegraph, GraphDB, Stardog, Apache Jena, and Oxigraph. As part of the EU Next Generation Internet (NGI) Search programme, QLever achieved full SPARQL 1.1 compliance in June 2025, including support for SPARQL Update and the Graph Store HTTP Protocol, enabling read/write operations. In the same year, with support from the Swiss Prototype Fund, the indexing approach was extended to encode common identifiers directly within numerical IDs, eliminating string lookups even at result export time. This allowed QLever to index and query datasets exceeding one trillion triples on a single commodity server.

A 2025 paper presented an efficient algorithm for large-scale spatial joins, demonstrating the ability to compute all spatial relations between the 1.4 billion geometric objects in the complete OpenStreetMap dataset in under three hours on a commodity PC, outperforming PostGIS by more than an order of magnitude.

== Contents ==
The official QLever instance provides API endpoints for querying the following datasets:

- Wikidata
- Wikimedia Commons
- Freebase
- OpenStreetMap
- OpenHistoricalMap
- UniProt
- PubChem
- DBLP
- OpenCitations
- IMDb
- Integrated Authority File
- YAGO
- DBpedia
- Wallscope Olympics database

For OpenStreetMap and OpenHistoricalMap data, the QLever engine supports a subset of GeoSPARQL functions, supplemented by a precomputed subset of GeoSPARQL relationships stored as dedicated triples.

== Adoption ==
The Wikimedia Foundation issued a report in January 2026 qualifying QLever and Virtuoso Universal Server as high-performance candidates for replacing Blazegraph.

Besides the official instance, the QLever engine also powers several other SPARQL endpoints. The computer science bibliographic database DBLP debuted a QLever instance in 2024. In 2025, the public SPARQL endpoint of the UniProt dataset hosted by the Swiss Institute of Bioinformatics switched from Virtuoso to QLever. In 2026, the Wikimedia Foundation chose QLever to replace Blazegraph as the triplestore for the Wikidata Query Service.

== See also ==
- List of SPARQL implementations
