= NitrosBase =

Russian high-performance multi-model database

- Developer: NitrosData
- Stable release: 2.0 / 3 December 2018
- Written in: C++
- Operating system: Windows, Linux
- Type: Multi-model database
- License: Proprietary
- Website: nitrosbase.com

NitrosBase is a Russian high-performance multi-model database system. The database system supports relational, graph and document database models.

== History ==
The developer initially implemented the database as a triplestore, being a Semantic Web pioneer in Russia. Remodelling into a multi-model database was supported by the Skolkovo Innovation Center in 2017.

The database is used in information systems that support the health-care reform in modern Russia.

== Characteristics ==
In NitrosBase, all data are stored in the format of the internal graph model, while data in other models are their views (representations; similar to SQL views). Regardless of the model in which format data were imported, it is possible to query them using the same query language thereby uniformly addressing data imported in different models.

Moreover, it is possible to query data in any model using a query language that is native for that model. NitrosBase supports the following languages:

- SQL (with elements of object syntax) – for querying data in relational view;
- SPARQL and Gremlin-style language Graph-it – for querying data in graph view;
- JSONiq and MongoDB Query – for querying data in document view.

== Implementation details ==
The internal graph model is close to RDF which is used in Blazegraph and Amazon Neptune. That allows it to treat the internal data graph both as RDF graph and as Property Graph, performing queries both in SPARQL and Gremlin-style languages.

Instead of indexes based on B+-trees traditionally used in graph databases, NitrosBase uses a sparse link index of its own devising. Another source of performance gain is storage optimization on the physical level in order to reduce the number of random access operations.

Like memSQL, NitrosBase translates a query into C++ code.

NitrosBase is reported to support hardware acceleration technologies such as non-volatile memory and, in the clustered version, RDMA over InfiniBand.

== Awards and achievements ==
A Nitrosbase-derived product called MS SQL Server Accelerator was awarded first prize at the Silicon Valley Open Doors conference in 2009 and named "startup of the day" of the Microsoft BizSpark program on 3 March 2010.

The application solution "System of topological analysis of semantic networks" created on the basis of NitrosBase was awarded the main prize of the "ZUBR - 2008" award in the category “Novelty of the Year”.
