= Ontotext =

Software company

Ontotext AD
- Company type: Private corporation
- Industry: Software Semantic Web; Semantic technology Linked data Text mining Information discovery Graph database Knowledge engineering Triplestore Knowledge graph
- Founded: 2000
- Headquarters: Bulgaria
- Key people: Atanas Kiryakov, CEO Vassil Momtchev, CTO Veska Davidova, COO
- Products: Ontotext GraphDB, Ontotext Metadata Studio, Ontotext Semantic Objects, Ontotext Refine
- Website: Ontotext web site

Ontotext is a software company that produces software relating to data management. Its main products are GraphDB, an RDF database; and Ontotext Platform, a general data management platform based on knowledge graphs. It was founded in 2000 in Bulgaria, and now has offices internationally. Together with the BBC, Ontotext developed one of the early large-scale industrial semantic applications, Dynamic Semantic Publishing, starting in 2010.

In October 2024 Ontotext merged with the Austrian Semantic Web Company to form Graphwise (https://graphwise.ai), one of the largest semantic technology companies world-wide.

Ontotext GraphDB, formerly OWLIM, is an RDF triplestore optimized for metadata and master data management, as well as graph analytics and data publishing. Since version 8.0 GraphDB integrates OpenRefine to allow for easy ingestion and reconciliation of tabular data. Ontotext Platform is a general-purpose data management tool centered around the idea of knowledge graphs.

== Ontotext GraphDB ==
Ontotext GraphDB (previously known as BigOWLIM) is a graph-based database capable of working with knowledge graphs produced by Ontotext, compliant with the RDF graph data model and the SPARQL query language. Some categorize it as a NoSQL database, meaning that it does not use tables like some other databases. In 2014 Ontotext acquired the trademark "GraphDB" from Sones.

GraphDB is also an advanced ontology (specification of entities, their properties, and their relationships) repository. The underlying idea of the database is of a semantic repository, storing semantic relationships between objects.

=== Architecture ===
GraphDB is used to store and manage semantic knowledge graph data. It is built on top of the RDF4J architecture for handling RDF data, implemented through the use of RDF4J's Storage and Inference Layer (SAIL). The architecture is made of three main components:

- The Workbench is a web-based administration tool. The user interface is based on RDF4J Workbench Web Application.
- The Engine consists of a query optimizer, reasoner, and a storage and plugin manager. The reasoner in GraphDB is forward chaining, reasoning forward from given priors, with the goal of total materialization. The plugin manager supports user-defined indexes and can be configured dynamically during run-time.

=== Uses ===
Ontotext Graph DB has been used in genetics, healthcare, data forensics, cultural heritage studies, geography, infrastructure planning, civil engineering, digital historiography, and oceanography. Commercial clients include the BBC, the Financial Times, Springer Nature, the UK Parliament, and AstraZeneca.

== See also ==
- Graph databases
- Graph theory
- RDF database
- Glossary of graph theory
