= SSE =

SSE may refer to:

== Computing ==
- Senior software engineer
- Secure service edge, a subset of SASE
- Server-sent events, pushes content to web clients
- Simple Sharing Extensions, extends RSS from unidirectional to bidirectional
- Sizzle (selector engine), JQuery feature, allowing CSS-like selection of DOM elements
- SPARQL Syntax Expressions
- SQL Server Express Edition, Microsoft software
- Streaming SIMD Extensions, an instruction set extension introduced with the Pentium III
- Social Software Engineering, social aspects of software development and the developed software
- Searchable symmetric encryption

== Economics and finance ==
- Social and solidarity economy
- Steady-state economy
- Substantial shareholdings exemption, a United Kingdom tax relief relating to capital gains on shares
- Supply-side economics
- Sustainable Stock Exchanges Initiative, a United Nations initiative to promote a peer-to-peer-based learning platform for stock exchanges
- Small-scale enterprise

=== Exchanges ===
- Shanghai Shipping Exchange, see Shipping industry of China
- Shanghai Stock Exchange
- Somalia Stock Exchange

== Entertainment ==
- Shin Seiki Evangelion, an anime produced by Gainax Animation
- Skyrim Special Edition, the remastered version of The Elder Scrolls V: Skyrim
- Spaceship Earth (Epcot), an attraction and icon at Epcot, located in the Walt Disney World Resort
- Sins of a Solar Empire, a video game created by Ironclad Games
- Subspace Emissary, the main story of the video game Super Smash Bros. Brawl
- Three venues in the UK:
  - The O2, formerly the SSE Arena, Belfast
  - Wembley Arena, formerly the SSE Arena, Wembley, London
  - OVO Hydro, formerly the SSE Hydro, Glasgow

== Language ==
- Scottish Standard English, or Standard Scottish English, a dialect of the English language
- Standard Singapore English, or Singapore Standard English, a dialect of the English language
- Sign Supported English, the use of British Sign Language with an English grammar

== Organizations ==
- SSE plc (formerly Scottish and Southern Energy), an energy company in the UK and Ireland
- School for Social Entrepreneurs, a training institution in the UK; founded by Michael Young
- School of Social Ecology, an academic unit of the University of California, Irvine
- Seed Savers Exchange, a seedbank
- Seven Seas Entertainment, a North American publisher of Japanese manga
- Society for Scientific Exploration, in fringe science
- Society for the Study of Evolution, in science, a professional organization of evolutionary biologists
- Southern Star Endemol, an Australian television company
- Stockholm School of Economics, one of Northern Europe's leading business schools
- Stredoslovenská energetika, an energy company in Slovakia
- Symbiosis School of Economics, an Economics college in India

== Other ==
- Scarborough subway extension, an extension of Line 2 Bloor–Danforth of the Toronto subway to Scarborough Town Centre
- Sensitive site exploitation, a military term used to describe retrieving incriminating information from a location
- Silk screen effect, a visual phenomenon seen in rear-projection televisions
- Soapsuds enema, a synonym for a large volume enema, whether or not soap is used
- South-southeast, a compass direction (one of the eight "half-winds")
- Submerged signal ejector, a device used by submarines
- Sum of squared estimate of errors, in statistics; see Residual sum of squares
- Shoreham-by-Sea railway station, Sussex, England (station code: SSE)
- Solid-state electrolyte, a type of solid ionic conductor electrolyte

== See also ==
- Shenzhen Stock Exchange (SZSE)
