= Wikibase =

MediaWiki software extensions

- Logo
- Developer: Wikimedia Deutschland
- Initial release: 2012
- Type: MediaWiki extension
- License: GPL-2.0-or-later
- Website: wikiba.se
- Repository: gerrit.wikimedia.org/g/mediawiki/extensions/Wikibase

Wikibase is a set of software tools for working with versioned semi-structured data in a central repository. It is based upon JSON instead of the unstructured data of wikitext normally used in MediaWiki. It stores and organizes information that can be collaboratively edited and read by humans and by computers, translated into multiple languages and shared with the rest of the world as part of the Linked Open Data (LOD) web. It is primary made up of two MediaWiki extensions, the Wikibase Repository, an extension for storing and managing data, and the Wikibase Client which allows for the retrieval and embedding of structured data from a Wikibase repository. It was developed for and is used by Wikidata, by Wikimedia Deutschland.

The data model for Wikibase links consists of "entities" which include individual "items", labels or identifiers to describe them (potentially in multiple languages), and semantic statements that attribute "properties" to the item. These properties may either be other items within the database, textual information or other semi structured information.

Wikibase has a JavaScript-based user interface, a fully featured API, and provides exports of all or subsets of data in many formats. Projects using it include Wikidata, Wikimedia Commons, Europeana's Project, Lingua Libre, FactGrid, the OpenStreetMap wiki, and wikibase.cloud.

Wikibase explainer video

== See also ==
- Linked Open Data
- Wikidata
- Knowledge graph
- Document-oriented database
- Entity–attribute–value model (EAV)
- Attribute (computing)
- Property (programming)
- Semantic wiki
- Semantic MediaWiki
- Triplestore
- Semantic Web
