= Kowari (disambiguation) =

A kowari is an Australasian marsupial.

Kowari may also refer to:

- KOWARI – Residual-Stress Diffractometer, a neutron diffractometer at OPAL, Australia's research reactor
- Kowari (software), an open-source metadata database written in Java
