= Mulgara (software) =

Mulgara Semantic Store
- Stable release: 2.1.13 / January 10, 2012
- Repository: github.com/quoll/mulgara
- Written in: Java
- Type: Semantic Web
- License: Open Software License
- Website: mulgara.org

Mulgara is a triplestore and fork of the original Kowari project. It is open-source, scalable, and transaction-safe. Mulgara instances can be queried via the iTQL query language and the SPARQL query language.

== History ==
Kowari was first made available for download in beta form on October 26, 2003. In April 2004, Tucana Technologies Inc demonstrated the Tucana Knowledge Server (TKS), a proprietary RDF database relying on Kowari as the basis. A steady number of releases occurred throughout 2004, including version 1.0.5 and 1.1 pre-release. The development of TKS stalled due to difficulties with funding at the end of 2004, while the development of Kowari continued on.

In September 2005, Tucana was bought by Northrop Grumman. In January 2006, Northrop Grumman threatened a Kowari developer with legal action if he released any new version of Kowari. As a consequence, Kowari was forked in July 2006. It was renamed to Mulgara as Northrop Grumman owned the Kowari trademark. All development on Kowari has stopped and the community moved to Mulgara. The legal cloud surrounding Kowari was eventually resolved, one of the outcomes was the adoption of the Open Software License 3.0. Since 2008 all new code is being licensed with the Apache 2.0 License.

Since 2006 Mulgara 1.0.0 has been released, significant changes to the transaction architecture was made to support JTA, SPARQL support, a Jena API, and integration with Sesame has been added. As of January 10, 2012 the latest version is 2.1.13.

== Internals ==
Mulgara is not based on a relational database due to the large numbers of table joins encountered by relational systems when dealing with metadata. Instead, Mulgara is a completely new database optimized for metadata management. Mulgara models hold metadata in the form of short subject-predicate-object statements, much like the W3C's Resource Description Framework (RDF) standard. Metadata may be imported into or exported from Mulgara in RDF or Notation 3 form.

== See also ==
- RDF4J
- Jena
- CubicWeb
- Blazegraph
