= WikiBase =

WikiBase or Wikibase may refer to:

- WikiBase, the software that runs the WikiWikiWeb, the first ever wiki
- Wikibase, a MediaWiki extension that runs Wikidata
