= OntoWiki =

- Stable release: 1.0.0 / October 4, 2016
- Written in: PHP
- Type: knowledge management system
- License: GPL
- Website: ontowiki.net
- Repository: github.com/AKSW/OntoWiki

OntoWiki was a free and open-source semantic wiki application, meant to serve as an ontology editor and a knowledge acquisition system. It is a web-based application written in PHP and using either a MySQL database or a Virtuoso triple store. OntoWiki is form-based rather than syntax-based, and thus tries to hide as much of the complexity of knowledge representation formalisms from users as possible. OntoWiki is mainly being developed by the Agile Knowledge Engineering and Semantic Web (AKSW) research group at the University of Leipzig, a group also known for the DBpedia project among others, in collaboration with volunteers around the world.

In 2009 the AKSW research group got a budget of €425,000 from the Federal Ministry of Education and Research of Germany for the development of the OntoWiki.

In 2010 OntoWiki became part of the technology stack supporting the LOD2 (linked open data) project. Leipzig University is one of the consortium members of the project, which is funded by a €6.5m EU grant.

The development ended in 2016 due to the lack of capacity migrating from PHP 5 to 7 including the required Zend Framework from version 1 to 2.

== See also ==
- Semantic MediaWiki
- DBpedia
