= NeuroLex =

Dynamic lexicon of neuroscience concepts

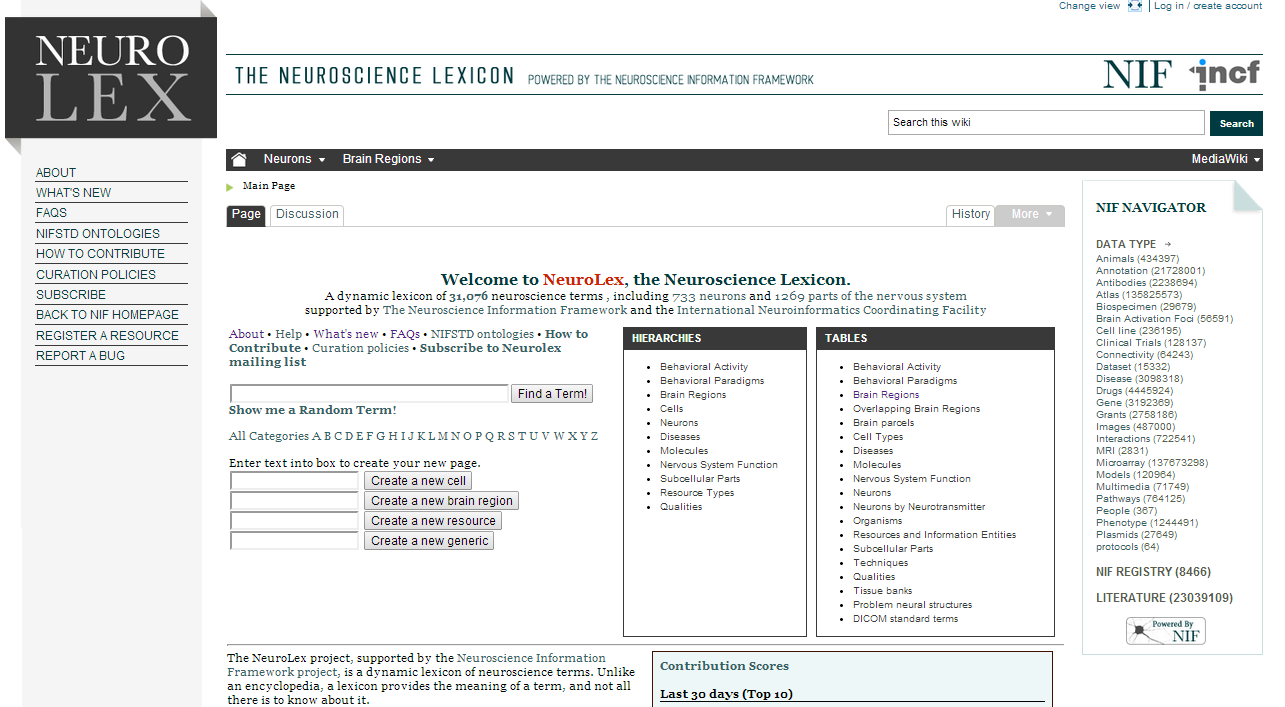

Content
- Description: Dynamic lexicon of neuroscience terms in a Semantic wiki
- Data types captured: Neuroscience

Contact
- Authors: Maryann Martone, Stephen Larson and others

Access
- Website: https://scicrunch.org/scicrunch/interlex/dashboard

Miscellaneous
- License: Creative Commons Attribution 3.0 Unported License

NeuroLex is a lexicon of neuroscience concepts supported by the Neuroscience Information Framework project, which is funded by the NIH Blueprint for Neuroscience Research. It is the lexical part of the NIF knowledge base, and NeuroLex is intended to make literature review easier and ensure consistent terminology and usage across researchers for the topics of experimental, clinical, and transnational neuroscience, and for genetic and genomic resources. It is structured as a semantic wiki, using Semantic MediaWiki.

NIF provides access to resources that are relevant to neuroscience, search strategies tailored to the field, and access to content that is traditionally "hidden" from web search engines. The Framework is an inventory of neuroscience databases, annotated and integrated with a unified system of biomedical terminology (i.e., NeuroLex). NIF supports concept-based queries across multiple scales of biological structure and multiple levels of biological function.

As part of the NIF, a search interface to many different sources of neuroscience information and data is provided. To make this search more effective, the NIF is constructing ontologies to help organize neuroscience concepts into category hierarchies, e.g. stating that a neuron is a cell. This will allow users to perform more effective searches and to organize and understand the information that is returned. But an important adjunct to this activity is to clearly define all of the terms that are used to describe data.

== Content ==
The initial entries in NeuroLex were built from the NIFSTD ontologies, which subsumed an earlier vocabulary, BIRNLex. It currently contains concepts that span gross anatomy, cells of the nervous system, subcellular structures, diseases, functions, and techniques. NIF relies on community input to add more content and correct the current information.

== See also ==
- NeuroNames
- Neuroscience Information Framework
