= Math Images Project =

Wiki

The logo of the Math Images Project

The Math Images Project was a wiki collaboration between Swarthmore College, the Math Forum at Drexel University, and the National Science Digital Library. The project aims to introduce the public to mathematics through beautiful and intriguing images found throughout the fields of math. The Math Images Project runs on MediaWiki software, as well as the Semantic MediaWiki extension.

Starting in summer 2011, the program expanded to include Sweet Briar College and Rensselaer Polytechnic Institute in addition to Swarthmore College and Drexel University.

== Collaboration ==
The National Science Digital Library and National Science Foundation provide the NDR, or National Science Digital Library Digital Repository. The NDR stores links and metadata to websites for use by educators and researchers. The Math Images Project uses the wiki plug-in built by the NSDL to submit page links and metadata to the NDR, allowing the Project to be of use to the greater education community.

== Images ==
All images on the site are required to be released under the GNU General Public License, so that the wiki remains freely editable and redistributable. Images are culled from Google Images or reputable educational sites. The authors locate and email a letter requesting permission, and approved images are added to the wiki.
