= Gardenology.org =

Horticulture wiki encyclopedia (2007-)

- Website type: Wiki
- Available in: English
- Website: http://gardenology.org/
- Launched: 2007
- Content license: Creative Commons Attribution-ShareAlike license

Gardenology.org is a wiki, launched in 2007, meant to serve as a free, "complete plant and garden wiki encyclopedia." There are over 19,000 articles on the site, and a plant search box. Gardenology.org is a "reference database with botany basics, cultivation, propagation, plant maintenance, glossary of botanical names and glossary of gardening terms".

The site runs on MediaWiki as well as the Semantic MediaWiki extension.

Gardenology.org uses the Creative Commons Attribution ShareAlike license for its content. Articles can cover an individual species or cultivar, a family, a gardening term or gardening topic. The site has message forums for gardening-related discussions.
