= Semantic query =

Aspect of information processing

Semantic queries allow for queries and analytics of associative and contextual nature. Semantic queries enable the retrieval of both explicitly and implicitly derived information based on syntactic, semantic and structural information contained in data. They are designed to deliver precise results (possibly the distinctive selection of one single piece of information) or to answer more fuzzy and wide open questions through pattern matching and digital reasoning.

Semantic queries work on named graphs, linked data or triples. This enables the query to process the actual relationships between information and infer the answers from the network of data. This is in contrast to semantic search, which uses semantics (meaning of language constructs) in unstructured text to produce a better search result. (See natural language processing.)

From a technical point of view, semantic queries are precise relational-type operations much like a database query. They work on structured data and therefore have the possibility to utilize comprehensive features like operators (e.g. >, < and =), namespaces, pattern matching, subclassing, transitive relations, semantic rules and contextual full text search. The semantic web technology stack of the W3C is offering SPARQL to formulate semantic queries in a syntax similar to SQL. Semantic queries are used in triplestores, graph databases, semantic wikis, natural language and artificial intelligence systems.

== Background ==
Relational databases represent all relationships between data in an implicit manner only. For example, the relationships between customers and products (stored in two content-tables and connected with an additional link-table) only come into existence in a query statement (SQL in the case of relational databases) written by a developer. Writing the query demands exact knowledge of the database schema.

Linked-Data represent all relationships between data in an explicit manner. In the above example, no query code needs to be written. The correct product for each customer can be fetched automatically. Whereas this simple example is trivial, the real power of linked-data comes into play when a network of information is created (customers with their geo-spatial information like city, state and country; products with their categories within sub- and super-categories). Now the system can automatically answer more complex queries and analytics that look for the connection of a particular location with a product category. The development effort for this query is omitted. Executing a semantic query is conducted by walking the network of information and finding matches (also called Data Graph Traversal).

Another important aspect of semantic queries is that the type of the relationship can be used to incorporate intelligence into the system. The relationship between a customer and a product has a fundamentally different nature than the relationship between a neighbourhood and its city. The latter enables the semantic query engine to infer that a customer living in Manhattan is also living in New York City whereas other relationships might have more complicated patterns and "contextual analytics". This process is called inference or reasoning and is the ability of the software to derive new information based on given facts.

== Articles ==
- Velez, Golda (2008). "Semantics Help Wall Street Cope With Data Overload". Wall Street & Technology. wallstreetandtech.com.
- Zhifeng, Xiao (2009). "Spatial information semantic query based on SPARQL". In Liu, Yaolin; Tang, Xinming (eds.). International Symposium on Spatial Analysis, Spatial-Temporal Data Modeling, and Data Mining. Vol. 7492. SPIE. pp. 74921P. Bibcode:2009SPIE.7492E..60X. doi:10.1117/12.838556. S2CID 62191842.
- Aquin, Mathieu (2010). "Watson, more than a Semantic Web search engine" (PDF). Semantic Web Journal.
- Dworetzky, Tom (2011). "How Siri Works: iPhone's 'Brain' Comes from Natural Language Processing". International Business Times.
- Horwitt, Elisabeth (2011). "The semantic Web gets down to business". computerworld.com.
- Rodriguez, Marko (2011). "Graph Pattern Matching with Gremlin". Marko A. Rodriguez. markorodriguez.com on Graph Computing.
- Sequeda, Juan (2011). "SPARQL Nuts & Bolts". Cambridge Semantics.
- Freitas, Andre (2012). "Querying Heterogeneous Datasets on the Linked Data Web" (PDF). IEEE Internet Computing.
- Kauppinen, Tomi (2012). "Using the SPARQL Package in R to handle Spatial Linked Data". linkedscience.org.
- Lorentz, Alissa (2013). "With Big Data, Context is a Big Issue". Wired. Archived from the original on April 17, 2014.

== See also ==
- Attention
- Dataspaces
- Knowledge Representation
- Linked Data
- Ontology alignment
- Philosophy
- Semantic Integration
- Semantic publishing
- Semantics of Business Vocabulary and Business Rules
- SPARQL
