= Hannah Bast =

German computer scientist

Hannah Bast is a German computer scientist known for her work on routing in transportation networks and search engines. She works as a professor at the University of Freiburg, where she holds the chair in algorithms and data structures and is dean of the faculty of engineering. She is one of the members of the Enquete Commission on Artificial Intelligence of the German federal parliament.

Bast studied at Saarland University, earning bachelor's degrees in mathematics and computer science in 1990, a master's degree in computer science in 1994, and a doctorate in 2000. Her dissertation, supervised by Kurt Mehlhorn, was Provably Optimal Scheduling of Similar Tasks. She worked as a researcher at the Max Planck Institute for Informatics until 2007, and as a visiting scientist at Google from 2008 to 2009, before moving to Freiburg in 2009. Bast was program chair for Track B (Engineering and Applications) of the 2018 European Symposium on Algorithms, where she conducted an experiment on the quality of peer review by having two parallel program committees reviewing the complete set of submissions independently. Bast will be co-chairs with Marc Najork and Min Zhang for SIGIR 2026.

Bast is leading the development of QLever and won several awards: the Saarland University Dissertation Award, the Otto Hahn Medal from the Max Planck Society, the Heinz Billing Prize (together with Stefan Funke), the Meyer Struckmann Science Prize, the Alcatel-Lucent Research Award, a Google Focused Research Award (together with Dorothea Wagner and Peter Sanders), and various teaching awards.
