= Wind Energy Data & Information Gateway =

American organization

The Wind Energy Data and Information (WENDI) Gateway was established by the Environmental Sciences Division of Oak Ridge National Laboratory in March 2010 to support the United States Department of Energy's Wind and Hydropower Technologies Program. It provided a digital library for wind energy-related data and information from a wide spectrum of sources—including data centers, scientific and technical journals, and geographic information systems (GIS), as well as the websites of government agencies, corporations and trade organizations. The gateway was taken offline after funding ended in August 2012. Much of its content was incorporated into the OpenEI site.

== Components ==
The WENDI Gateway had two main components: a wind energy metadata clearinghouse and the wind energy WebGIS Application. The WENDI Gateway also provided pages about the basics of how wind energy works, lists of major turbine manufacturers, a list of renewable resource educational programs, and a page about wind energy's effects on wildlife.

=== Wind Energy Metadata Clearinghouse ===
The Wind Energy Metadata Clearinghouse included thousands of metadata records related to wind energy. These metadata records provide users with easy access to data and information from a variety of resources, such as peer-reviewed journal articles, government agency reports, private industry reports, GIS services, datasets, and news articles. Users can search the Clearinghouse's metadata records by a simple keyword search or narrow their results using more specific filters, including publication date and geographic area. Researchers can then search and scan these metadata records to grasp the vital information—title, author, abstract, and other bibliographic elements—about each resource, quickly assessing its potential usefulness for their work. In many metadata records, a URL to the resource itself is provided, such that those potentially useful resources may be readily viewed in their entirety.

=== Wind Energy GIS ===
WENDI Wind GIS Home

The Wind Energy GIS displayed wind energy-related spatial data with a standard web browser. The Wind Energy GIS features 10 categories of data layers: background; wind energy-related; transmission and infrastructure; geopolitical; hydrology; land ownership, designation and usage; elevation; land cover; ecosystem and climate; and soils.

==== Layers ====
Users selected from five options for the background:

- Terraserver-USGS topographic map
- Terraserver Digital Ortho-Quadrangle
- JPL Landsat Global Mosaic
- Terraserver Urban Areas
- Bing Maps Virtual Earth

Wind energy-related data layers included the location of U.S. wind energy power plants; the NREL wind power classification map; state-by-state renewable portfolio standards, and installed wind capacity by state. Transmission and infrastructure layers included the location of transmission lines (as shown by a 1993 report by the U.S. Federal Emergency Management Agency (FEMA), NEXRAD RADAR sites, location of airports, location of railroads, and an open street map. Geopolitical layers showed 110th Congressional Districts of the US, country boundary, US states, US counties, and the population of US counties.

The hydrology layer showed the US river network. Land ownership, designation and usage layers illustrated boundaries of federal lands and Indian lands, as well as the renewable energy generation potential on Environmental Protection Agency tracked sites according to the Office of Solid Waste and Emergency Response (OSWER) Center for Program Analysis (OCPA). Elevation or land cover layers showed related information.

The ecosystem and climate layers displayed:

- Average Annual Precipitation (1961–1990)
- Tornadoes (1950–2004)
- Major Landfalling Atlantic Hurricanes
- Ecoregions of North America
- Bailey Ecoregion
- Köppen climate classification

Users could view ranges of five bat species of concern. Bats were killed by wind turbines because the spinning blades cause a drop in air pressure which results in barotrauma.

Finally, the soils layer illustrated FAO soil classifications in the US.

== Target audience ==
Many factors must be considered before the construction of a wind energy facility. Among the most important factors to consider are the potential site's wind resource; access to existing transmission lines; access to a reliable power purchaser or market; and population density around the site. Numerous other economic, geographic, environmental, and political considerations must be taken into account as well. The WENDI Gateway was designed to provide data and information regarding such considerations and thereby serve the needs of an array of wind energy stakeholders. Such stakeholders likely include:

- Wind farm developers and constructors
- Public utilities commissions
- Electric companies
- Policymakers
- Environmental scientists
- Wind energy modelers/forecasters
- Academia
- Students and educators

== See also ==
- GIS
- OpenEI
- Wind power
- Wind power in the United States
