= CubicWeb =

Semantic web framework

- Original author: Logilab
- Initial release: 2001; 25 years ago
- Stable release: 4.8.0 / 21 May 2024; 23 months ago
- Written in: Python
- Operating system: Unix-like and Microsoft Windows
- Type: Semantic web framework
- License: GPL 2, LGPL 2.1
- Website: www.cubicweb.org
- Repository: forge.extranet.logilab.fr/cubicweb/cubicweb

CubicWeb is a free and open-source semantic web application framework, licensed under the LGPL. It is written in Python.

It has been an open free software project since October 2008, but the project began in 2000, and was initially developed by Logilab for internal uses such as intranet, bug tracker and forge applications.

As of 2012, CubicWeb is being used in large-scale semantic web and linked open data applications, and international corporations.

== Concepts ==
The framework is entirely driven by a data model. Once the data model is defined, one gets a functional web application and can further customize the views (by default it provides a set of default views for each type of data).

A cube is a reusable component defining specific features. For example, a cube forge allows one to create one's own forge and the forge cube reuses the cubes comment, file, email, etc. Interesting general purpose cubes include dbpedia and openlibrary.

The framework has been translated to English, French, Spanish and German (April 2011).

== Functions ==
- Semantic web: supports OWL/RDF
- Multi-source: supports RQL, SQL, LDAP, Subversion and Mercurial
- RQL: Relationship query language to ease data querying
- Migration tool: fits into agile development
- View selection principle: the engine selects the best view to fit the content to display according to the context
- Cubes library: a wide range of cubes are available on the forge

== See also ==
- Jena
- Mulgara
- Sesame
