= Neuroscience Information Framework =

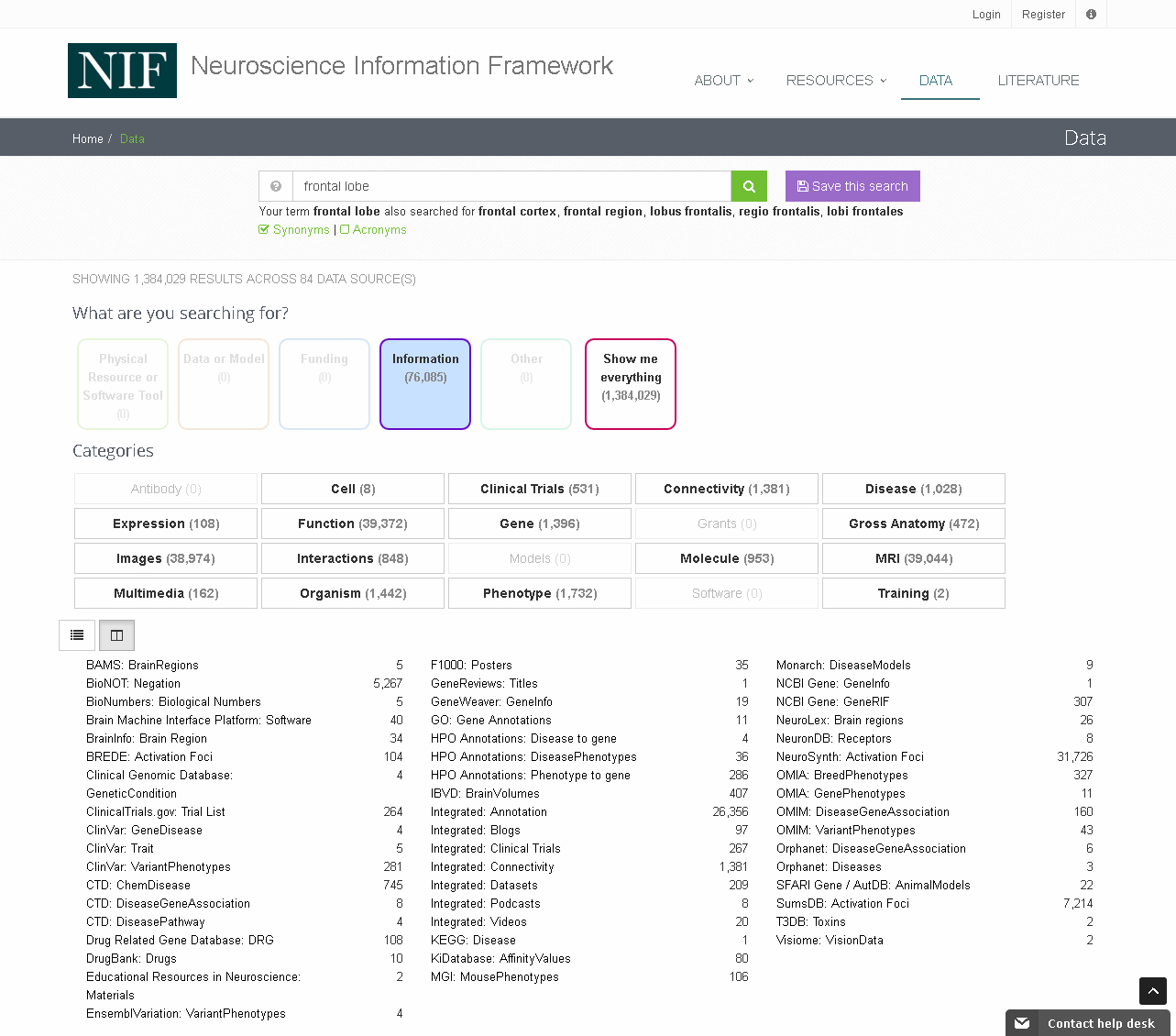

Content
- Description: Web-based neuroscience resources: data, materials, and tools
- Data types captured: Neuroscience

Contact
- Authors: Martone, M.E.
- Release date: 2008

Access
- Data format: html, xml, json, csv
- Website: http://www.neuinfo.org/
- Web service URL: http://neuinfo.org/developers
- Sparql endpoint: http://neurolex.org/ query sparql end point

Miscellaneous
- License: Creative Commons Attribution 3.0
- Versioning: 6.2
- Data release frequency: weekly
- Curation policy: continuous human and machine

The Neuroscience Information Framework is a repository of global neuroscience web resources, including experimental, clinical, and translational neuroscience databases, knowledge bases, atlases, and genetic/genomic resources and provides many authoritative links throughout the neuroscience portal of Wikipedia.

== Description ==
The Neuroscience Information Framework (NIF) is an initiative of the NIH Blueprint for Neuroscience Research, which was established in 2004 by the National Institutes of Health.

Development of the NIF started in 2008, when the UC San Diego School of Medicine obtained an NIH contract to create and maintain "a dynamic inventory of web-based neurosciences data, resources, and tools that scientists and students can access via any computer connected to the Internet". The project is headed by Maryann Martone, co-director of the National Center for Microscopy and Imaging Research (NCMIR), part of the multi-disciplinary Center for Research in Biological Systems (CRBS), headquartered at University of California, San Diego. Together with co-principal investigators Jeffrey S. Grethe and Amarnath Gupta, Martone leads a national collaboration that includes researchers at Yale University, the California Institute of Technology, George Mason University, Harvard University, and Washington University in St. Louis.

== Goals ==
Unlike general search engines, NIF provides much deeper access to a focused set of resources that are relevant to neuroscience, search strategies tailored to neuroscience, and access to content that is traditionally “hidden” from web search engines. The NIF is a dynamic inventory of neuroscience databases, annotated and integrated with a unified system of biomedical terminology (i.e. NeuroLex). NIF supports concept-based queries across multiple scales of biological structure and multiple levels of biological function, making it easier to search for and understand the results. NIF will also provide a registry through which resources providers can disclose availability of resources relevant to neuroscience research. NIF is not intended to be a warehouse or repository itself, but a means for disclosing and locating resources elsewhere available via the web.

The NIFSTD, or NIF Standard Ontology contains many of the terms, synonyms and abbreviations useful for neuroscience, as well as dynamic categories such as defined cell classes based on various properties like neuron by neurotransmitter or by circuit role or drugs of abuse according to the National Institutes on Drug Abuse. Any term (with associated synonyms) or dynamic category (all terms with their synonyms) can be used to simultaneously query all of the data that NIF currently indexes, please find several examples below:

- available data about the hippocampus including synonyms
- data about parkinson's disease including archaic synonyms like paralysis agitans
- neocortical neuron a dynamic category includes all neurons that have cell soma in any part of the neocortex

== Content ==
NIF content can be thought of as a Catalog (NIF Registry) and deep database search (NIF Data Federation)

- The NIF Catalog has the largest listing of NIH-funded, neuroscience-relevant resources, including scientific databases, software tools, experimental reagents and tools, knowledge bases and portals, and other entities identified by the neuroscience research community.

A listing of current resources can be found at www.neuinfo.org/registry

- The NIF Data Federation searches deep database content of over 150 databases including: various NCBI databases (PubMed, Gensat, Entrez Gene, Homologene, GEO) as well as many large and small databases that have something to do with neuroscience including Gemma (microarray data from the nervous system), CCDB & CIL (images of neurons and astrocytes, mainly), GeneNetwork, AgingGenesDB, XNAT, 1000 Functional Connectomes. The 'complete' list (as of April 2013) can be found in the table below. An updated list can be found on the Data Federation page.
- In addition many databases that have very similar types of data have been integrated into 'virtual databases', which combine many databases into one table. For example, the AntibodyRegistry combines data from 200+ vendors, the NIF Integrated BrainGeneExpression combines gene expression data from Gensat, Alan Brain, and Mouse Genome Informatics, the Connectivity view combines six databases that have statements about nervous system connectivity, the Integrated Animal view combines data about experimental animal catalogs available to researchers from transgenic or inbred worms, zebrafish, mice and rats. We add more of these as data are registered, so check back to this page to see the current contents.
- For an exhaustive and up to date list of Databases and Datasets registered to NIF please check this page www.neurolex.org. The table below was updated April 9, 2013.

Dataset or Database Name	Type
ZFIN	Database, Data repository, Image collection
Zebrafish International Resource Center	Biomaterial supply resource, Antibody supplier, Biomaterial analysis service, Organism supplier, Material storage repository
XNAT Central	Database, Image collection, Data repository
WormBase	Database, Data repository, Data analysis service, Software resource
Wired Science Blogs	Blog, Narrative resource
Wired Science	Blog
WikiPathways	Wiki
VMD	Database, Data analysis service
Visiome Platform	Database, Video resource, Topical portal, Software repository, Data repository, Image
UniProtKB	Database, Data repository
UCSF Laboratory for Visual Neuroscience	Laboratory portal, Image, Video resource
UCLA Multimodal Connectivity Database	Data repository, Data analysis service, Database
This Week In Science	Podcast
TheScienceJobs.com	Job resource, Meeting resource, Workshop
The Guardian: Science Weekly	Podcast
The Guardian: Science Videos	Video resource
The Guardian: Science	Blog, Narrative resource
The Daily Scan	Narrative resource, Blog
The Cell: An Image Library	Video resource, Image, Data repository
Temporal-Lobe: Hippocampal - Parahippocampal Neuroanatomy of the Rat	Database
TAIR	Database, Data repository, Data analysis service, Experimental protocol
T3DB	Database
Synapse Web	Atlas, Image collection, Training material
SumsDB (Surface Management System Database) and WebCaret Online Visualization	Atlas, Database, Data repository, Data analysis service
Simtk.org	Topical portal, Software resource, Data set, Software repository
SGN	Database, Data repository, Data analysis service, Source code
SGD	Database, Data repository, Standard specification, Data analysis service
SfN Brain Briefings	Narrative resource
SFARI Gene: AutDB	Database, Data repository
SciLogs	Blog
Scientific American Observations	Blog
Scientific American Guest Blog	Blog
Scientific American Cross-Check	Blog
Scientific American Bering in Mind	Blog
ScienceNOW	Narrative resource
ScienceBlogs: Medicine and Health	Blog
ScienceBlogs: Life Science	Blog
ScienceBlogs: Brain and Behavior	Blog
Science Talk	Podcast
Science Podcast	Podcast, Narrative resource
Science Careers	Job resource, Narrative resource
Sciblogs	Blog
Royal College of Psychiatrists Podcasts	Podcast
RGD	Data repository, Web accessible database, Database, Data analysis service, Organism supplier
RetractionWatch.com	Blog
Retina Project	Spatially referenced dataset, Image collection
ResearchCrossroads	Funding resource, Data repository
Research Blogging	Blog, Database, Data repository
Reactome	Database, Data analysis service, Web service, Book
QUEST	Narrative resource, Community building portal, Podcast, Outreach program, Training material, Training resource, Video resource
PubMed Health	Database
PubChem	Web accessible database, Database, Service resource, Data repository, 3D spatial image
Psychoactive Drug Screening Program Ki Database	Database, Data repository
Pseudomonas Genome Database	Database, Data analysis service
Protocol Online - Your labs reference book	Experimental protocol
PomBase	Database, Data repository
PolygenicBlog	Blog
PLoS Blogs	Blog
Physiobank	Database
PharmGKB	Web accessible database, Database, Data repository, Web service, Data set
PDB	Database, 3D spatial image, Web service, Data analysis service, Data repository
Oxford Science Blog	Blog
Open Access Series of Imaging Studies	Atlas, Database
One Mind Biospecimen Bank Listing	Tissue bank, Cell repository, Brain bank, Data repository
OMIM	Database
Olfactory Receptor DataBase	Database, Data analysis service, Data repository
Olfactory Bulb Odor Map DataBase (OdorMapDB)	Atlas, Database
Now at NEJM	Blog
Novus Biologicals	Antibody supplier, Biomaterial manufacture, Material resource, Service resource
NITRC-IR	Image collection, Data repository
NITRC	Community building portal, Software repository
NIMH Chemical Synthesis and Drug Supply Program	Reagent manufacture, Reagent supplier
NIH VideoCasting	Video resource, Podcast, Data repository
NIH Neuroscience Microarray Consortium	Data analysis service, Database, Data repository
NIGMS Human Genetic Cell Repository	Cell repository, Biospecimen repository
NIF Registry Automated Crawl Data	Data set
NIF Registry	Database
NIF Integrated Video View	Video resource
NIF Integrated Software View	Software resource
NIF Integrated Podcasts View	Podcast
NIF Integrated Nervous System Connectivity View	Database
NIF Integrated Manually Extracted Annotation	Data set
NIF Integrated Jobs	Job resource
NIF Integrated Gene-Disease Interaction	Database
NIF Integrated Disease View	Database
NIF Integrated Clinical Trials	Database
NIF Integrated Brain Gene Expression View	Database
NIF Integrated Blogs	Blog, Narrative resource
NIF Integrated Auto-Extracted Annotation	Data set
NIF Integrated Animal View	Organism supplier
New York Times - Well	Blog
New Scientist Jobs	Job resource, Postdoctoral program resource
Neuroskeptic	Blog
NeuroPod	Podcast
NeuronDB	Database, Data analysis service
NeuroMorpho.Org	Data repository, Database, Image collection
NeuroMab	Antibody supplier
Neurology Podcast	Podcast
Neurofed	People resource
neuroelectro	Database
Neurodatabase.org	Database, Data repository
NCBI Protein	Database
NCBI Gene	Web accessible database, Database
NCBI	Data repository, Data analysis software
Naturejobs	Job resource, Narrative resource
Nature Podcast	Podcast
Nature Network Blogs	Blog
Naturally Selected	Blog
National Institutes of Health Stem Cell Tables	Data set
National Institutes of Health Research Portfolio Online Reporting Tool	Database
National Academy of Sciences Podcasts	Podcast
MPO	Ontology
Mouse Genome Informatics Transgenes	Semi structured knowledge
Monster	Job resource
ModelDB	Simulation software, Database, Data repository, Source code
MNI Podcasts	Podcast
Mind Hacks	Blog, Book
MGI	Database, Data repository
LabSpaces	Narrative resource, Blog, Community building portal, Experimental protocol
Kawasaki Disease Dataset2	Data set
Kawasaki Disease Dataset1	Data set
Journal of Visualized Experiments	Journal, Video resource, Experimental protocol
Journal of Comparative Neurology Antibody database	Database
jobs.ac.uk	Job resource
JCVI CMR	Database, Data analysis service
IXI dataset	Data set, Image collection
It Takes 30	Blog, Job resource
Internet Brain Volume Database	Database, Web service, Data analysis service
International Mouse Strain Resource	Organism supplier, Data repository
Indeed	Job resource
Immune Epitope Database and Analysis Resource	Database, Data analysis service, Web service
Human Brain Atlas	Atlas, Video resource, Training resource
HomoloGene	Web accessible database, Database, Service resource
Health.Data.gov	Database, Software resource, Structured knowledge
Hays	Job resource, Service resource
H2SO4Hurts	Blog
Gray Matters	Podcast, Narrative resource
Grants.gov	Funding resource
Gramene	Database, Web service, Data analysis service
goCognitive	Training material, Video resource, Assessment test provider
GO	Ontology, International standard specification, Database, Data repository
Glomerular Activity Response Archive	Database, Image collection, Data analysis service
GENSAT - Gene Expression Nervous System Atlas	Atlas, Organism supplier, Biomaterial manufacture, Biomaterial supply resource
Genomes Unzipped	Blog, Data set, Source code
Genetic Analysis Software	Data set, Software resource, Software repository
GeneNetwork	Database, Data repository
GeneDB Tbrucei	Database, Data analysis service
GeneDB Pfalciparum	Database
GeneDB Lmajor	Database, Data analysis service
Gene Weaver	Web accessible database, Data analysis service, Data repository
Gene Ontology Tools	Data set, Software repository, Registry
Gene Expression Omnibus	Database, Data repository, Service resource, Data set
Gemma	Database, Data processing software, Data repository
Gait in Parkinsons Disease	Database
Gait Dynamics in Neuro-Degenerative Disease Data Base	Database, Web accessible database
FLYBASE	Database, Data repository, Organism-related portal, Data analysis service
F1000 Posters	Storage service resource, Narrative resource, Analysis service resource
Expression Atlas of the Marmoset	Data set, Expression atlas
EU Clinical Trials Register	Database
EEGbase	Data repository, Database
EcoCyc	Database
DrugBank	Database
Drug Related Gene Database	Database, Data repository
Disorders index from the National Institute of Neurological Disorders and Stroke (NINDS)	Data set
Discover Magazine	Narrative resource, Blog, Podcast, Image collection
DISCO	Software resource, Service resource
DictyBase	Database, Biospecimen repository
Daring Nucleic Adventures - genegeek	Blog
CRCNS	Data set, Data repository, Funding resource
Comparative Toxicogenomics Database	Database, Data analysis service
CoCoMac (Collations of Connectivity Data on the Macaque Brain)	Database, Data visualization software, Data repository, Bibliography
Clinicaltrials.gov: A Service Of The National Institutes Of Health	Database, Data repository
Clinical Trials Network (CTN) Data Share	Data set
ChEMBLdb	Web accessible database, Database
CHEBI	Database, Ontology
Cerebellar Platform	Database, Software repository, Data repository, Data analysis software
CENtral Science	Blog
Cell Centered Database	Database, Data repository, Image collection
Cassandras Tears	Blog
Candida Genome Database	Database, Data repository, Data analysis service
Caenorhabditis Genetics Center	Organism supplier, Biospecimen repository, Standard specification, Cell repository
Brede Database	Database, Data analysis service
BrainSpan: RNA-Seq exons summarized to genes	Expression atlas
BrainSpan: RNA-Seq exons	Expression atlas
BrainSpan: Exon microarray summarized to probe sets	Expression atlas
BrainSpan: Exon microarray summarized to genes	Expression atlas
BrainPod	Podcast
BrainMaps.org: High Resolution Brain Atlases	Atlas, Data analysis service
BrainInfo	Atlas, Database, Topical portal, Standard specification
Brain Science Podcast	Podcast, Narrative resource
Brain Architecture Management System	Database, Ontology, Data repository
BMI (Brain Machine Interface) Platform	Data repository, Database, Bibliography, Software repository
Bloomington Drosophila Stock Center	Organism supplier, Material storage repository
BioPortfolio	Narrative resource, Blog, Job resource, Database, Portal
BioNOT	Database
Biointeractive	Training resource, Video resource, Podcast, Training material
BioGRID	Database, Web service, Software resource, Data repository
Biocompare	Database, Antibody supplier
Beta Cell Biology Consortium	Database, Reagent supplier
BAMS Nested Regions	Database
BAMS Connectivity	Database
BAMS Cells	Database
Avian Brain Circuitry Database	Spatially referenced dataset, Data repository, Image
ASPGD	Database, Data repository, Data analysis service
ASAP	Database, Data repository, Data analysis service
Antibody Registry	Database
AmiGO	Software application, Database, Data analysis service
American Journal of Psychiatry Podcasts	Podcast
Allen Mouse Brain Connectivity Atlas	Spatially referenced dataset
Allen Mouse Brain Atlas	Atlas, Database
All In The Mind	Podcast
Aging Genes and Interventions Database	Database, Data repository
Addgene	Topical portal, Biospecimen repository, Biomaterial supply resource
Access-ScienceJobs.co.uk	Job resource, Narrative resource
A Lady Scientist	Blog
60-Second Mind	Podcast

== Data Via Web Services ==
The idea of NIF is that while scientific databases do have a plethora of interfaces, some quite complex, there should be a uniform way of looking at them and searching though them. This uniform search idea has been extended to services so that developers can take advantage of the work done at NIF to enhance their own applications by gaining access to all of the data available through the NIF interface.

When data is made public via NIF, it also becomes immediately available via web services. These RESTful web services can be thought of as programming functions that can be built into other applications. Currently, the data can be queried and pulled as an XML feed and several other sites are now pulling NIF data via services, including DOMEO and Eagle i. Developers can learn how to access data by viewing the WADL file available at http://neuinfo.org/developers

Below are some public RESTful services that can be accessed by students or used in building applications:

- Annotate any text by using this url:

  * http://nif-services.neuinfo.org/servicesv1/v1/annotate?content=The%20cerebellum%20is%20a%20wonderful%20thing&longestOnly=true

The url contains the text you want to annotate, the input, which is "The cerebellum is a wonderful thing". To change this you can try to use any other text. The output from the service will return the sentence with a SPAN tag denoting that it recognized the term cerebellum and it is a type of anatomical_structure. The terms that are not recognized are returned without span tags. Note, the longestOnly=true parameter is optional it means that only the longest set of terms will be recognized an in this example it makes no difference, but in terms like hippocampal neuron it will only return one response.

Developers can use the span tags to bring back information about the recognized term because the identifier is unique and linked to definitions, synonyms, other brain regions and in some cases images: For a human readable version see

  * http://neurolex.org/wiki/Birnlex_1489

For a machine readable version see

  * http://nif-services.neuinfo.org/ontoquest/concepts/Birnlex_1489?get_super=true

- Retrieve neuroscience auto-complete suggestions, e.g.,

  * http://nif-services.neuinfo.org/servicesv1/v1/vocabulary?prefix=hippocampu

The above example shows the term completion for "hippocampu", but you can try to type on the url any other set of letters. The return of the service is a set of terms that matches this string including: Hippocampus and many hippocampal cells.

- Retrieve the registry items that match a search term:

  * http://nif-services.neuinfo.org/servicesv1/v1/federation/data/nlx_144509-1?q=miame

The NIF Registry is a data source and this service will return all items in the registry that match the particular search term. In this case the term is miame, as in the miame standard. To use this data retrieving function you can type query terms into the end of this url in addition to or instead of the term miame. This will work the same way as typing your terms into the search box here:

  * https://neuinfo.org/mynif/search.php?q=hippocampus&t=registry

Note, make sure to check the terms and conditions for any source of data, terms and conditions are available as a courtesy in NIF, but you may also check with the individual sources that you wish to incorporate in your applications, all of the above described data is owned by NIF and is covered under the Creative Commons Attribution license, so it can be freely distributed and shared.

== See also ==
- NeuroLex
- NeuroNames
