= NeuroNames =

Nomenclature for structures in the brain and spinal cord

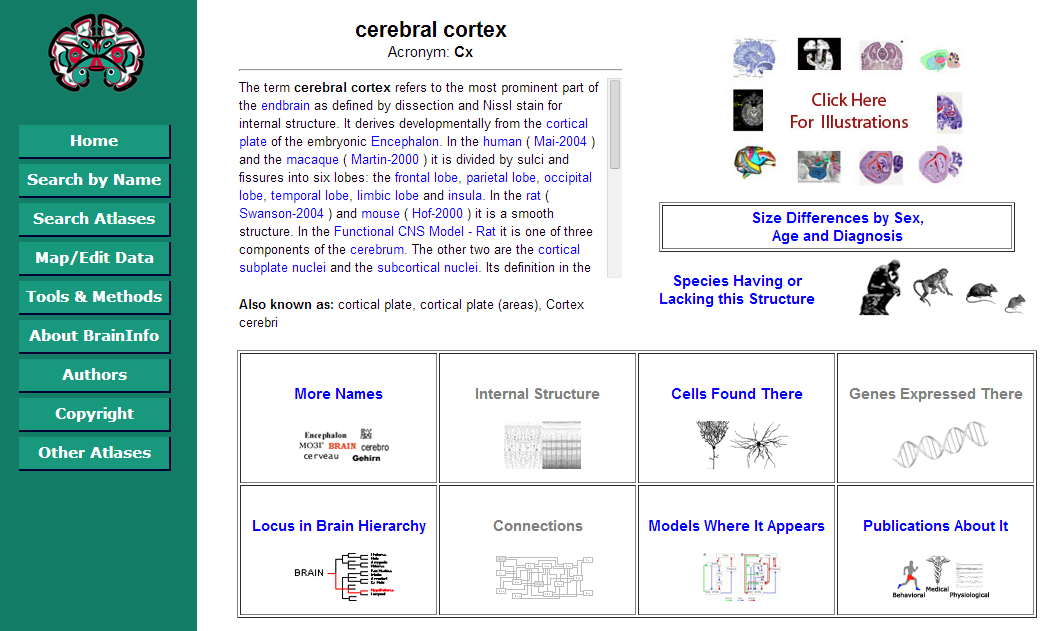

Content
- Description: Comprehensive Hierarchical Nomenclature for Structures of the Primate Brain (human and macaque)
- Data types captured: Neuroanatomy

Access
- Website: braininfo.rprc.washington.edu

Miscellaneous
- License: Creative Commons Attribution 3.0 Unported License

NeuroNames is an integrated nomenclature for structures in the brain and spinal cord of the four species most studied by neuroscientists: human, macaque, rat and mouse. It offers a standard, controlled vocabulary of common names for structures, which is suitable for unambiguous neuroanatomical indexing of information in digital databases. Terms in the standard vocabulary have been selected for ease of pronunciation, mnemonic value, and frequency of use in recent neuroscientific publications. Structures and their relations to each other are defined in terms of the standard vocabulary. Currently NeuroNames contains standard names, synonyms and definitions of some 2,500 neuroanatomical entities.

The nomenclature is maintained by the University of Washington and is the core component of a tool called "BrainInfo". BrainInfo helps one identify structures in the brain. One can either search by a structure name or locate the structure in a brain atlas and get information such as its location in the classical brain hierarchy, images of the structure, what cells it has, its connections and genes expressed there. Information can be accessed by any of some 16,000 synonyms in eight languages.

NeuroNames is a source vocabulary of the Metathesaurus of the Unified Medical Language System.

== See also ==
- NeuroLex
- Neuroscience Information Framework
- Talairach coordinates
