= SPARQL Query Results XML Format =

- Filename extension: .srx
- Internet media type: application/sparql-results+xml
- Developed by: W3C
- Initial release: 2008; 17 years ago
- Latest release: 1.1 (Second Edition)
- Type of format: multi-platform, serial data streams
- Container for: database information organized
- Contained by: XML
- Extended from: XML
- Standard: W3C SPARQL XML
- Open format?: Yes

A SPARQL Query Results XML (also sometimes called SPARQL Results Document) is a file stores data (value, URI and text) in XML. This document is generally the response by default of a RDF database after a SPARQL query.

== See also ==
- SPARQL
- SPARQL Query Results JSON Format
