= Heinz Billing Prize =

In 1993, the Heinz Billing Prize for the advancement of scientific computation was presented for the first time. The aim of this award is to honour the achievements of those who have spent time and effort developing the hardware and software crucial for scientific advances. It is the purpose of the award to honour outstanding scientific contributions in all areas of computational science, specifically:

- Modelling and computer simulation
- Design of user interfaces based on new scientific findings
- Data handling and data analysis procedures
- Scientific visualization of data and processes

== Previous Winners ==
- 1993 Dr. Hans Thomas Janka, Dr. Ewald Müller, Dr. Maximilian Ruffert
- 1994 Dr. Rainer Goebel
- 1995 Dr. Ralf Giering
- 1996 Dr. Klaus Heumann
- 1997 Dr. Florian Mueller
- 1998 Prof. Dr. Edward Seidel
- 1999 Dr. Alexander Pukhov
- 2000 Dr. Oliver Kohlbacher
- 2001 Dr. Jörg Haber
- 2002 Dipl. Ing. Daan Broeder, Dr. Hennie Brugman and Dipl. Ing. Reiner Dirksmeyer
- 2003 Dipl. Phys. Roland Chrobok, Dr. Sigurður F. Hafstein and Dipl. Phys. Andreas Pottmeier
- 2004 Dr. Markus Rampp and Dr. Thomas Soddemann
- 2005 Dr. Patrick Jöckel and Dr. Rolf Sander
- 2006 Rafal Mantiuk
- 2007 Axel Fingerle and Klaus Röller/ Hannah Bast and Stefan Funke
- 2011 Peter Wittenburg
- 2013 Thomas Hrabe
- 2015 Andreas Brandmeier
- 2017 Dr. Christian Schulz
- 2019 Tim Dietrich
- 2021 Prof. Dr. Adam Runions
- 2023 Dr. Andrea Kölzsch and Dr. Anne Scharf

== See also ==
- List of computer science awards
