= Wikidata =

Collaborative multilingual knowledge graph

- Screenshot Main page of Wikidata in October 2026
- Website type: Knowledge base; Wiki
- Available in: Multiple languages
- Owner: Wikimedia Foundation
- Editor: Wikimedia community
- Website: wikidata.org
- Commercial: No
- Registration: Optional
- Launched: October 29, 2012; 14 years ago
- Content licence: CC0 (Note: Only for structured data in the main (item), Property, Lexeme and EntitySchema namespaces. Text in the other namespaces is licenced under Creative Commons Attribution-ShareAlike 4.0.)

Wikidata is a collaboratively edited multilingual knowledge graph hosted by the Wikimedia Foundation. It is a source of open data released under the Creative Commons CC0 public domain dedication. It is for the use of both Wikimedia and external projects. Launched in October 2012, it is developed mainly by Wikimedia Deutschland and supplies the interlanguage links and some of the infobox data used by Wikipedia and other Wikimedia projects. Wikidata is a wiki powered by the software MediaWiki, including its extension for semi-structured data, the Wikibase. As of early 2025, Wikidata had 1.65 billion item statements. As of October 2026, Wikidata held more than 123 million data entities, such as items, properties and lexemes.

== Concept ==
This diagram shows the most important terms used in Wikidata.

Wikidata is a document-oriented database, focusing on items, which represent any kind of topic, concept, or object. Each item is allocated a unique persistent identifier called its QID, a positive integer prefixed with the upper-case letter "Q". (Note: Q is the first initial of Qamarniso Vrandečić (née Ismoilova), an Uzbek chemist and Wikimedian married to Wikidata co-developer Denny Vrandečić.) This makes it possible to provide translations of the basic information describing the topic each item covers without favoring any particular language.

Some examples of items and their QIDs are 1988 Summer Olympics (Q8470), love (Q316), Johnny Cash (Q42775), Elvis Presley (Q303), and Gorilla (Q36611).

Item labels do not need to be unique. For example, there are two items named "Elvis Presley": Elvis Presley (Q303), which represents the American singer and actor, and Elvis Presley (Q610926), which represents his self-titled album. However, the combination of a label and its description must be unique. To avoid ambiguity, an item's QID is hence linked to this combination.

=== Main parts ===
The item for Earth (Q2), annotated to show the main parts of an item page: the label, item identifier, description, aliases, statements and sitelinks

Fundamentally, an item consists of:

- An identifier (the QID), related to a label and a description.
- Optionally, multiple aliases and some number of statements (and their properties and values).
- Optionally, sitelinks to pages on the same topic in Wikipedia and other Wikimedia projects.

=== Statements ===
The "population" statements of Wikidata's item on Tokyo (Q1490), annotated. The values carry qualifiers and references; ranks mark one value as preferred and one as deprecated, and constraint checks flag a missing qualifier.

Statements are how any information known about an item is recorded in Wikidata. Formally, they consist of key–value pairs, which match a property (such as "author", or "publication date") with one or more entity values (such as "Sir Arthur Conan Doyle" or "1902"). For example, the informal English statement "milk is white" would be encoded by a statement pairing the property color (P462) with the value white (Q23444) under the item milk (Q8495).

Statements may map a property to more than one value. For example, the "occupation" property for Marie Curie could be linked with the values "physicist" and "chemist", to reflect the fact that she engaged in both occupations.

Values may take on many types, including other Wikidata items, strings, numbers, or media files. Properties prescribe what types of values they may be paired with. For example, the property official website (P856) may only be paired with values of type "URL".

Optionally, qualifiers can be used to refine the meaning of a statement by providing additional information. For example, a "population" statement could be modified with a qualifier such as "point in time (P585): 2011" (as its own key-value pair). Values in the statements may also be annotated with references, pointing to a source backing up the statement's content. As with statements, all qualifiers and references are property–value pairs. Each statement also has a rank: normal by default, preferred for the most current value or the one that best represents consensus, or deprecated for a value known to contain errors.

=== Properties ===
Example of a simple statement consisting of one property–value pair

Each property has a numeric identifier prefixed with a capital P and a page on Wikidata with an optional label, description, aliases, and statements. As such, there are properties with the sole purpose of describing other properties, such as subproperty of (P1647).

Properties may also define more complex rules about their intended usage, termed constraints. For example, the capital (P36) property includes a "single value constraint", reflecting the reality that (typically) territories have only one capital city. Constraints are treated as testing alerts and hints, rather than inviolable rules.

Before a new property is created, it needs to undergo a discussion process.

The most used property is cites work (P2860), which had been used more than 313,000,000 times as of October 2026.

=== Lexemes ===
The English lexeme sugarcane (L42759), annotated: its lemma, language and lexical category, a sense linked to an item and to translations, and its singular and plural forms

In linguistics, a lexeme is a unit of lexical meaning representing a group of words that share the same core meaning and grammatical characteristics. Similarly, Wikidata's lexemes are items with a structure that makes them more suitable for storing lexicographical data. Since 2018, Wikidata has supported lexicographical entries in the form of lexemes.

In Wikidata, lexicographical entries have a different identifier from regular item entries. These entries are prefixed with the letter L, such as in the example entries for book (L16168) and cow (L3726). Lexicographical entries in Wikidata can contain statements, senses, and forms. The use of lexicographical entries in Wikidata allows for the documentation of word usage, the connection between words and items on Wikidata, word translations, and enables machine-readable lexicographical data.

In 2020, lexicographical entries on Wikidata exceeded 250,000. The language with the most lexicographical entries was Russian, with a total of 101,137 lexemes, followed by English with 38,122 lexemes. Lexemes from 668 languages were recorded. As of October 2026, Wikidata had more than 1.7 million lexemes in 1,568 languages, with about 18 million forms and 945,000 senses.

=== Entity schemas ===
Entity schema E270, for buildings, annotated. Written in ShEx, it lists the properties an item about a building should have ("+", one or more values) or may have ("*", any number).

In Wikidata, a schema is a data model that outlines the necessary attributes for a data item. For instance, a data item that uses the attribute "instance of" with the value "human" would typically include attributes such as "place of birth," "date of birth," "date of death," and "place of death." The entity schema in Wikidata utilizes Shape Expression (ShEx) to describe the data in Wikidata items in the form of a Resource Description Framework (RDF). The use of entity schemas in Wikidata helps address data inconsistencies and unchecked vandalism.

In January 2019, development started of a new extension for MediaWiki to enable storing ShEx in a separate namespace. Entity schemas are stored with different identifiers than those used for items, properties, and lexemes. Entity schemas are stored with an "E" identifier, such as E10 for the entity schema of human data instances and E270 for the entity schema of building data instances. The extension was deployed on Wikidata on May 28, 2019 and enables contributors to use ShEx for validating and describing Resource Description Framework data in items and lexemes. Any item or lexeme on Wikidata can be checked against an entity schema to test whether it conforms to the structure the schema describes, and this makes it an important tool for quality assurance. Since July 2024, statements can also link to entity schemas, for example with the property EntitySchema for this class (P12861).

== Content ==
Items for scholarly articles are the biggest part of Wikidata, followed by the collection of biographies.

Wikidata's content collections include data for biographies, medicine, digital humanities, scholarly metadata through the WikiCite project.

It includes data collections from other open projects including Freebase.

In 2025, Wikidata held about 116 million items, corresponding to about 16 billion triples.

== Development ==
The creation of the project was funded by donations from the Allen Institute for AI, the Gordon and Betty Moore Foundation, and Google, Inc., totaling €1.3 million. The development of the project is mainly driven by Wikimedia Deutschland under the management of Lydia Pintscher, and was originally split into three phases:

1. Centralising interlanguage links – links between Wikipedia articles about the same topic in different languages.
2. Providing a central place for infobox data for all Wikipedias.
3. Creating and updating list articles based on data in Wikidata and linking to other Wikimedia sister projects, including Meta-Wiki and the own Wikidata (interwikilinks).

=== Initial rollout ===
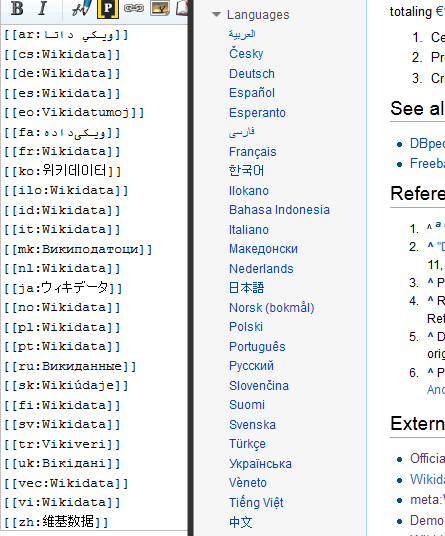
A Wikipedia article's list of interlanguage links as they appeared in an edit box (left) and on the article's page (right) prior to the release of Wikidata. Each link in these lists is to an article that requires its own list of interlanguage links to the other articles; this is the information centralized by Wikidata.

The language menu of a Wikipedia article (here Earth). Its "Edit interlanguage links" action opens the article's item on Wikidata, where the links to the other language editions are kept.

Wikidata was launched on 29 October 2012 and was the first new project of the Wikimedia Foundation since 2006. At release, only the centralization of language links was available. This enabled items to be created and filled with basic information: a label – a name or title, aliases – alternative terms for the label, a description, and links to articles about the topic in all the various language editions of Wikipedia (interwikipedia links).

Historically, a Wikipedia article would include a list of interlanguage links (links to articles on the same topic in other editions of Wikipedia, if they existed). Wikidata was originally a self-contained repository of interlanguage links. Wikipedia language editions were still not able to access Wikidata, so they needed to continue to maintain their own lists of interlanguage links.

On January 14, 2013, the Hungarian Wikipedia became the first to enable the provision of interlanguage links via Wikidata. This functionality was extended to the Hebrew and Italian Wikipedias on January 30, to the English Wikipedia on February 13, and to all other Wikipedias on 6 March. After no consensus was reached over a proposal to restrict the removal of language links from the English Wikipedia, they were automatically removed by bots. On September 23, 2013, interlanguage links went live on Wikimedia Commons.

=== Statements and data access ===
On February 4, 2013, statements were introduced to Wikidata entries. The possible values for properties were initially limited to two data types (items and images on Wikimedia Commons), with more data types (such as coordinates and dates) to follow later. The first new type, string, was deployed on 6 March.

The ability for the various language editions of Wikipedia to access data from Wikidata was rolled out progressively between 27 March and April 25, 2013. On September 16, 2015, Wikidata began allowing so-called arbitrary access, or access from a given article of a Wikipedia to the statements on Wikidata items not directly connected to it. For example, it became possible to read data about Germany from the Berlin article, which was not feasible before. On April 27, 2016, arbitrary access was activated on Wikimedia Commons.

According to a 2020 study, a large proportion of the data on Wikidata consists of entries imported en masse from other databases by Internet bots, which helps to "break down the walls" of data silos.

=== Query service and other improvements ===
The Wikidata Query Service showing the results of an example SPARQL query for items that are instances of "cat" (Q146), annotated

On September 7, 2015, the Wikimedia Foundation announced the release of the Wikidata Query Service, which lets users run queries on the data contained in Wikidata. The service uses SPARQL as the query language. As of September 2026, at least 41 tools allowed querying the data in different ways. It uses Blazegraph as its triplestore and graph database. Blazegraph has not been maintained since 2018, and the growth of Wikidata strained the service; in May 2025 the graph was split in two, with scholarly articles moved to a separate query service. In June 2026, the Wikimedia Foundation and Wikimedia Deutschland chose QLever to replace Blazegraph, with the aim of moving all query traffic to it by June 30, 2027.

In August 2021, Wikimedia Deutschland released the Query Builder, "a form-based query builder to allow people who don't know how to use SPARQL" to write a query. A REST API for Wikidata was released in January 2023, and its first stable version went live on November 11, 2024.

The Wikidata Embedding Project was made available in October 2025. It provides a vector-based semantic search tool, allowing plain-language queries, and supports the Model Context Protocol standard that makes the data more readily available to AI systems. The project is a partnership between Wikimedia Deutschland, Jina.AI and DataStax, an IBM subsidiary.

=== Logo ===
The bars on the logo contain the word "WIKI" encoded in Morse code. It was created by Arun Ganesh and selected through community decision.

== Reception ==
In November 2014, Wikidata received the Open Data Publisher Award from the Open Data Institute "for sheer scale, and built-in openness".

In December 2014, Google announced that it would shut down Freebase in favor of Wikidata.

As of November 2018, Wikidata information was used in 58.4% of all English Wikipedia articles, primarily for external identifiers or coordinates. In aggregate, data from Wikidata is shown in 64% of all Wikipedias' pages, 93% of all Wikivoyage articles, 34% of all Wikiquotes', 32% of all Wikisources', and 27% of Wikimedia Commons. In a 2020 study, Wikimedia Foundation researcher Isaac Johnson cited estimates that 62% of articles across all language editions of Wikipedia transcluded Wikidata content as of August 2020, but found that on the English Wikipedia, transclusion that affected the content of an article occurred in about 5% of articles, rather than the 61% suggested by earlier statistics.

As of October 2026, Wikidata listed more than 60 external tools for visualizing its data, and by August 2021 over 300 papers had been published about Wikidata.

In 2025, Wikidata was recognised as a "digital public good" by the Digital Public Goods Alliance. In August 2025, Fast Company described Wikidata as "the world's largest free knowledge graph".

== Applications ==
- Wikidata's structured dataset has been used by virtual assistants such as Apple's Siri and Amazon Alexa.
- OpenRefine, a data-cleaning tool, can reconcile tabular data against Wikidata items through a reconciliation service.
- Mwnci extension can import data from Wikidata to LibreOffice Calc spreadsheets
- Scholia, a web service that builds profiles of researchers, organizations, journals and topics from the bibliographic data in Wikidata, which it queries through the Wikidata Query Service.
- MathQA – a mathematical question answering system
- KDE Itinerary – a privacy conscious open source travel assistant that uses data from Wikidata
- Verified Handles, a directory of social media accounts, links most of its entries to Wikidata items and adds the accounts listed there.
- Google originally started a frame semantic parser project that aimed to parse the information on Wikipedia and transfer it into Wikidata by coming up with relevant statements using artificial intelligence.

A systematic literature review of the uses of Wikidata in research was carried out in 2019.

== See also ==
- Abstract Wikipedia
- BabelNet
- DBpedia
- Semantic MediaWiki
- Wikibase
- Wikimedia Enterprise
