= Metavid =

metavid
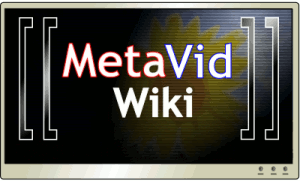
- Commercial: No
- Launched: March 2006
- Current status: Inactive

Metavid is a free-software wiki-based community archive project for audio video media. The site hosts public domain US legislative footage. It was started as a Digital Arts/New Media MFA thesis project of Michael Dale and Abram Stern under the advisement of Professor Warren Sack in late 2005 at the University of California, Santa Cruz. Its continued development is supported by a grant from the Sunlight Foundation. It works by using a "simple Linux box to record everything that C-SPAN shoots", which can then be used to provide "brief searchable clips using closed-captioning text".

== Metavid Archive ==
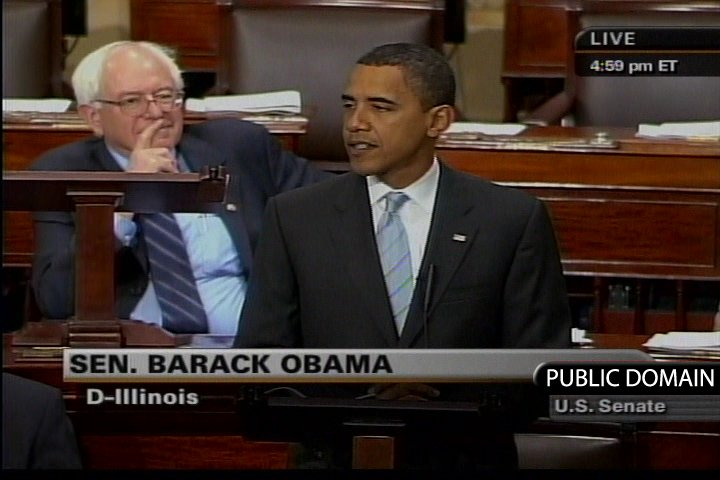
A sample image of Barack Obama from the metavid archive

Metavid has been archiving since early 2006 and hosts over a thousand of hours of US House and Senate floor footage. Originally metavid hosted house and senate committees but they were taken down in response to legal threats by C-SPAN. As of late 2007 C-SPAN has adopted a more liberal copyright policy.

The Metavid archive hosts the largest free & reusable archive of house and senate legislative footage. Through a partnership with archive.org the original mpeg2s are made accessible through the metavid site. The US House launched its own video site and repository in 2010 and the Senate followed in 2011. As these content sources became available, Metavid stopped archiving these chambers due to the labor-intensive process of separating proprietary C-SPAN content from public domain floor proceedings.

== Metavid Software ==
Metavid is a free software platform for online communities to engage with audio/video media assets. The site encodes video in patent unencumbered ogg video. The Metavid software is built on top of MediaWiki and Semantic Mediawiki, enabling semantic temporal metadata for media streams. Metavid also features basic sequencing and the mv_embed library that enables remote embedding of hosted clips with associated transcripts. Metadata such as transcripts are exported in CMML, an open xml standard developed by Annodex foundation to exchange of temporal metadata. All media and metadata is accessible in a temporal namespace enabling requesting and serving of arbitrary time segments of media and associated metadata. Metavid was presented at wikimania07 and at wikimania08.

The Metavide MediaWiki extension has not been maintained since 2016.
