= SPARQL Syntax Expressions =

Parse tree for representing SPARQL Algebra expressions

SPARQL Syntax Expressions (alternatively, SPARQL S-Expressions) is a parse tree (a.k.a. concrete syntax) for representing SPARQL Algebra expressions.

== Application ==
They have been used to apply the BERT language model to create SPARQL queries from natural language questions.
