= Semantic MediaWiki =

Software for managing structured data in MediaWiki

- Developer: various
- Stable release: 7.4.0 / 2 November 2026; 1 day ago
- Written in: PHP
- Type: MediaWiki extension
- License: GPL-2.0-or-later
- Website: www.semantic-mediawiki.org
- Repository: github.com/SemanticMediaWiki/SemanticMediaWiki

Semantic MediaWiki (SMW) is an extension to MediaWiki that allows for annotating semantic data within wiki pages, thus turning a wiki that incorporates the extension into a semantic wiki. Data that has been encoded can be used in semantic searches, used for aggregation of pages, displayed in formats like maps, calendars and graphs, and exported to the outside world via formats like RDF and CSV.

== Authors ==
Semantic MediaWiki was initially created by Markus Krötzsch, Denny Vrandečić and Max Völkel, and was first released in 2005. Its development was initially funded by the EU-funded FP6 project SEKT (CORDIS site), and was later supported in part by Institute AIFB of the University of Karlsruhe (later renamed the Karlsruhe Institute of Technology). Currently SMW is maintained by an open-source-community on GitHub with Jeroen De Dauw as one of the lead maintainers.

== Basic syntax ==
Every semantic annotation within SMW is a "property" connecting the page on which it resides to some other piece of data, either another page or a data value of some type, using triples of the form "subject, predicate, object".

As an example, a page about Germany could have, encoded within it, the fact its capital city is Berlin. On the page "Germany", the syntax would be:

... the capital city is [[Has capital::Berlin]] ...

which is semantically equivalent to the statement "Germany" "Has capital" "Berlin". In this example the "Germany" page is the subject, "Has capital" is the predicate, and "Berlin" is the object that the semantic link is pointing to.

However, the much more common way of storing data within Semantic MediaWiki is via MediaWiki templates which themselves contain the necessary SMW markup.

For this example, the "Germany" page could contain a call to a template called "Country", that looked like this:

{{Country
...
| Capital = Berlin
...
}}

The "Country" template would handle storing whatever the value of the parameter "Capital" is, using the property "Has capital". The template would also handle the display of the data. Semantic MediaWiki developers have estimated that 99% of SMW data is stored in this way.

Semantic MediaWiki also has its own inline querying tools. For instance, if pages about countries stored additional information like population data, a query could be added to a page that displays a list of all countries with a population greater than 50 million, along with their capital city; and Germany would appear in such a list, with Berlin alongside it.

== Usage ==
Semantic MediaWiki is in use on over 1,600 public active wikis around the world, in addition to an unknown number of private wikis. Notable public wikis that use SMW include the Metacafe wiki, Web Platform, SNPedia, SKYbrary, Metavid, Familypedia, OpenEI, the Libreplanet wiki, the Free Software Directory and translatewiki.net.

Organizations that use SMW internally include Pfizer, Harvard Pilgrim Health Care, Johnson & Johnson Pharmaceutical Research and Development, the Pacific Northwest National Laboratory, the Metropolitan Museum of Art, NATO, U.S. Department of Defense, and the International Atomic Energy Agency.

SMW has notably gained traction in the health care domain for collaboratively creating bio-medical terminologies and ontologies. Examples are LexWiki, which is jointly run by the Mayo Clinic, National Cancer Institute, World Health Organization and Stanford University; and Neuroscience Information Framework's NeuroLex.

Semantic MediaWiki used to be supported on the now-defunct wiki farm Referata, by default. Fandom has previously activated Semantic MediaWiki on user request, but has stopped doing so since upgrading to version 1.19 of MediaWiki; Fandom wikis, such as Familypedia, that had started using it are able to continue.

== Semantic MediaWiki and Wikidata ==
Some members of the academic community began urging the use of SMW on Wikipedia since it was first proposed. In a 2006 paper, Max Völkel et al. wrote that in spite of Wikipedia's utility, "its contents are barely machine-interpretable. Structural knowledge, e.g. about how concepts are interrelated, can neither be formally stated nor automatically processed. Also the wealth of numerical data is only available as plain text and thus can not be processed by its actual meaning."

The Wikimedia community began adding semantic microformat markup to Wikipedia in 2007. In 2010, Wikimedia Foundation Deputy Director Erik Möller stated that Wikimedia was interested in adding semantic capabilities to Wikipedia, but that they were unsure whether Semantic MediaWiki was the right solution, since it was unclear whether it could be used without negatively affecting Wikipedia's performance.

In April 2012, the Wikimedia Foundation project Wikidata began, which provides a massive shared database for use in articles of every language in Wikipedia, and other Wikimedia projects. Its content is also freely available to anyone else. Wikidata supplants the potential use of Semantic MediaWiki on Wikipedia; its software uses Wikibase.

== Spinoff extensions ==
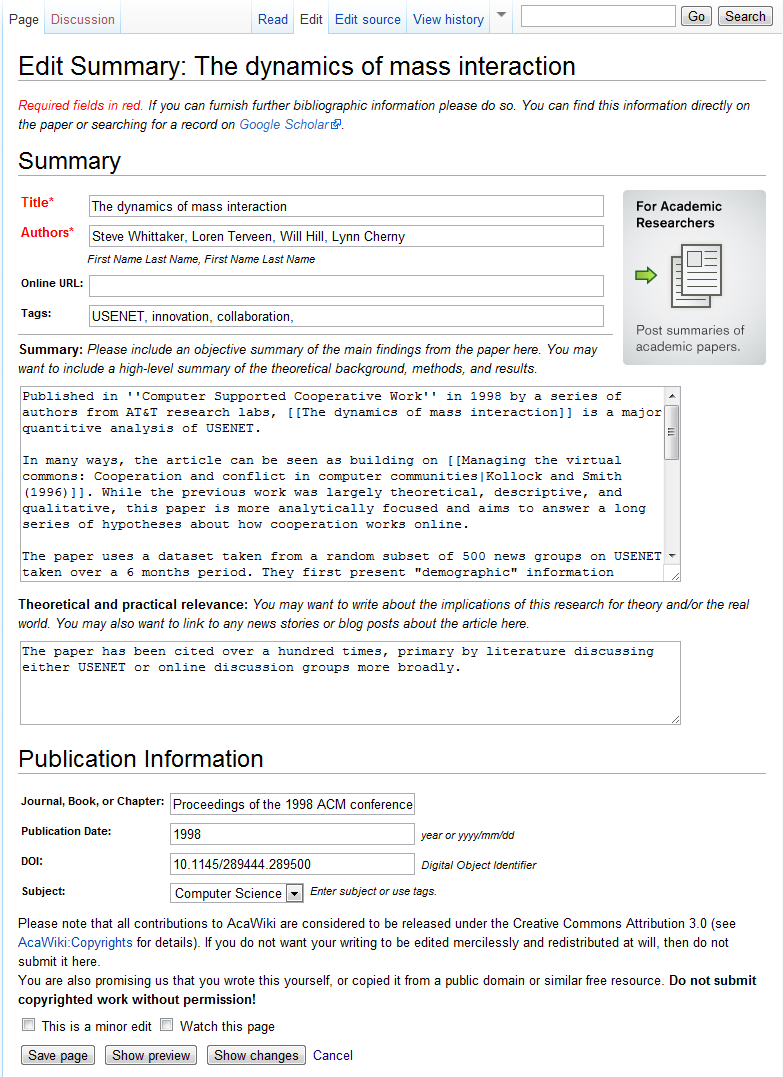
A form to edit a page, using the Semantic Forms extension

A variety of open-source MediaWiki extensions exist that use the data structure provided by Semantic MediaWiki. Among the most notable are:

- Page Forms - enables user-created forms for adding and editing pages that use semantic data
- Semantic Result Formats - provides a large number of display formats for semantic data, including charts, graphs, calendars and mathematical functions
- Semantic Drilldown - provides a faceted browser interface for viewing the semantic data in a wiki
- Maps - displays geographic semantic data using various mapping services

== Community ==
The official gathering for Semantic MediaWiki developers and users is SMWCon, which has been held twice a year since 2010, in various cities in the United States and Europe. The largest such event, in October 2013 in Berlin, had around 90 attendees. The first virtual SMWCon 2020 attracted 234 attendees.

== See also ==
- DBpedia
- Freebase
- OntoWiki
