= Wikimedia Deutschland =

German Wikimedia chapter

- Abbreviation: WMDE
- Formation: June 13, 2004; 22 years ago
- Headquarters: Berlin
- Region served: Germany
- Website: https://www.wikimedia.de/

Wikimedia Deutschland (also known as WMDE, Wikimedia Germany, and the Society for the Promotion of Free Knowledge) is a German non-profit association based in Berlin. It was founded in 2004 and recognized that year as the first national chapter of the Wikimedia Foundation, which funds and supports Wikipedia and other projects.

In 2025, according to its records, it had over 110,000 dues-paying members and employed around 180 people, working on projects ranging from public relations to technical development of Wikidata to community support for contributors to Wikipedia and sister projects. It has its own fundraising team and is supported in part by dues from its membership. It also directly supports free knowledge access and development beyond Wikimedia projects, and hosts the annual summit of Wikimedia affiliates.

== Goals and activities ==
The association is involved in software development for Wikimedia projects, supporting projects by volunteers from Wikimedia projects, and cooperating with educational, scientific and cultural institutions on the subject of free knowledge, "to promote equal opportunities in access to knowledge and education."

Its statutes specify that the association should fulfill the tasks of the Wikimedia Foundation, using wikis for collecting and distributing knowledge, and that its activities include:

supporting the operation of the Wikimedia Foundation's wikis;
the offline distribution of the Wikimedia projects in digital or print formats;
hosting events and distributing information about free content, wikis and Wikimedia;
and clarifying scientific, social, cultural and legal issues related to free content and wikis.

At the 27th general assembly in May 2022, the chapter decided on a framework of values of "participation, diversity, free and open access, justice, sustainability and respectful cooperation".

== Organizational structure ==
=== Legal status ===
Wikimedia Deutschland was founded on June 13, 2004 by 34 Wikipedians, and entered into the national register of associations on October 25, 2004 under the number VR 23855 in the district court of Berlin-Charlottenburg. The tax office for corporations in Berlin has recognized the activities of the association as a non-profit under the tax number 27/029/42207 for its promotion of education.

Wikimedia Fördergesellschaft mit beschränkter Haftung was registered on November 8, 2004 under the number HRB 130183. The tax office for corporations in Berlin has recognized the activities of the association as a non-profit under the tax number 27/029/42215 for its promotion of education.

=== Parts of the organization ===
The governing bodies of the association are the General Assembly, the Honorary Executive Committee and the full-time Executive Board.

==== General Assembly ====
The General Assembly is the supreme body of the association. It decides on fundamental association questions and matters, elects the presidency and decides whether the presidency and the board are to be discharged. Active members can participate in elections and decisions on amendments to the statutes and contributions by remote voting. The members present decide on simple motions.

According to their own statements, the number of members grew to over 72,000 by April 2019. In addition, Wikipedia co-founder Jimmy Wales is an honorary member of the association. In 2024, membership exceeded 110,000.

Supporting members are not entitled to vote. Honorary members are exempt from the payment of contributions according to the statutes; they have the same rights as active members.

General meetings have been held twice a year since 2011.

==== Executive Committee ====
An honorary executive committee consists of a chairman, a treasurer and five assessors. The committee appoints, supervises and dismisses the Board of Directors and is responsible for the strategic orientation of the association. Lukas Mezger was chairman of the executive committee from December 2018 to May 2022. At the 27th general meeting on May 14, 2022, Alice Wiegand was elected his successor.

==== Board of Directors ====
From 2006 until a change in the association's statutes on March 19, 2011, a managing director was responsible for the day-to-day management and management of the office, under the supervision of an honorary board of directors. However, he did not have the power to represent the association. Since 2011, a full-time board of directors has been responsible for the management and represents the association externally.

Previous managing directors include Pavel Richter, Jan Engelmann, Christian Rickerts, Abraham Taherivand, Christian Humborg, and Franziska Heine.

==== Staff ====
In 2022 the association employed over 150 people.

In 2014, WMDE staff elected a works council which has 7 members as of 2026. The works council has negotiated works agreements covering topics like salary guideline structures (but not the actual amounts, which is reserved right of trade unions) and sick leave reintegration plans and mobile work. WMDE has not concluded any collective agreement with a trade union, so staff are not covered by any collective agreement coverage.

== Finances ==
The association is financed mainly by donations and membership fees. Some donations come from annual banner-driven fundraising campaigns on the wikis.

According to WMDE's own statements, these banner donations were used "in consultation" with the Wikimedia Foundation until 2009 - for example for technology and community support - and thus a contribution "made to international work". Around 30% of annual expenditure in 2009 went into administration and advertising.

Since 2012, a fundraising agreement between the chapter and the Wikimedia Foundation covers the distribution of banner donations between the chapter and the foundation. Unlike most regions and languages, where donations are processed by the Foundation and granted out to regional chapters and community projects, fundraising from banners on German Wikipedia are processed by the chapter and a portion are passed on to the foundation.

In 2015, Wikimedia Deutschland processed 7.6 million euros in banner donations, kept just over 2 million euros, and received another 840,000 euros from the Wikimedia Foundation's Funds Dissemination Committee (FDC). Membership fees contributed another 1.1 million euros to their budget. Funds are used primarily for software development (€1,360,000 for 2015), community support (€770,000) and education, science & culture (€610,000). The next largest costs are for board operations (€490,000 including specialist lectures on international relations and political advice) and public communication and outreach (€405,000).

== Collaborations ==
In 2008, Creative Commons International moved its office to share with Wikimedia Deutschland.

In 2008, Wikimedia Deutschland collaborated with the German Federal Archive to upload nearly 100,000 images to Wikimedia Commons.

== Controversies ==
Around 2010, Wikimedia Germany was criticized by members and German Wikipedians for its lack of transparency in publishing salaries and consultant fees.

In 2014, the premature departure of Pavel Richter from the association caused a public dispute, leading to the resignation of the chairman and the replacement of the majority of the Executive Committee at the next General Assembly. Three former association presidents returned to the board to work through the following period.
