= S. Asef Hossaini =

Sayed Asef Hossaini
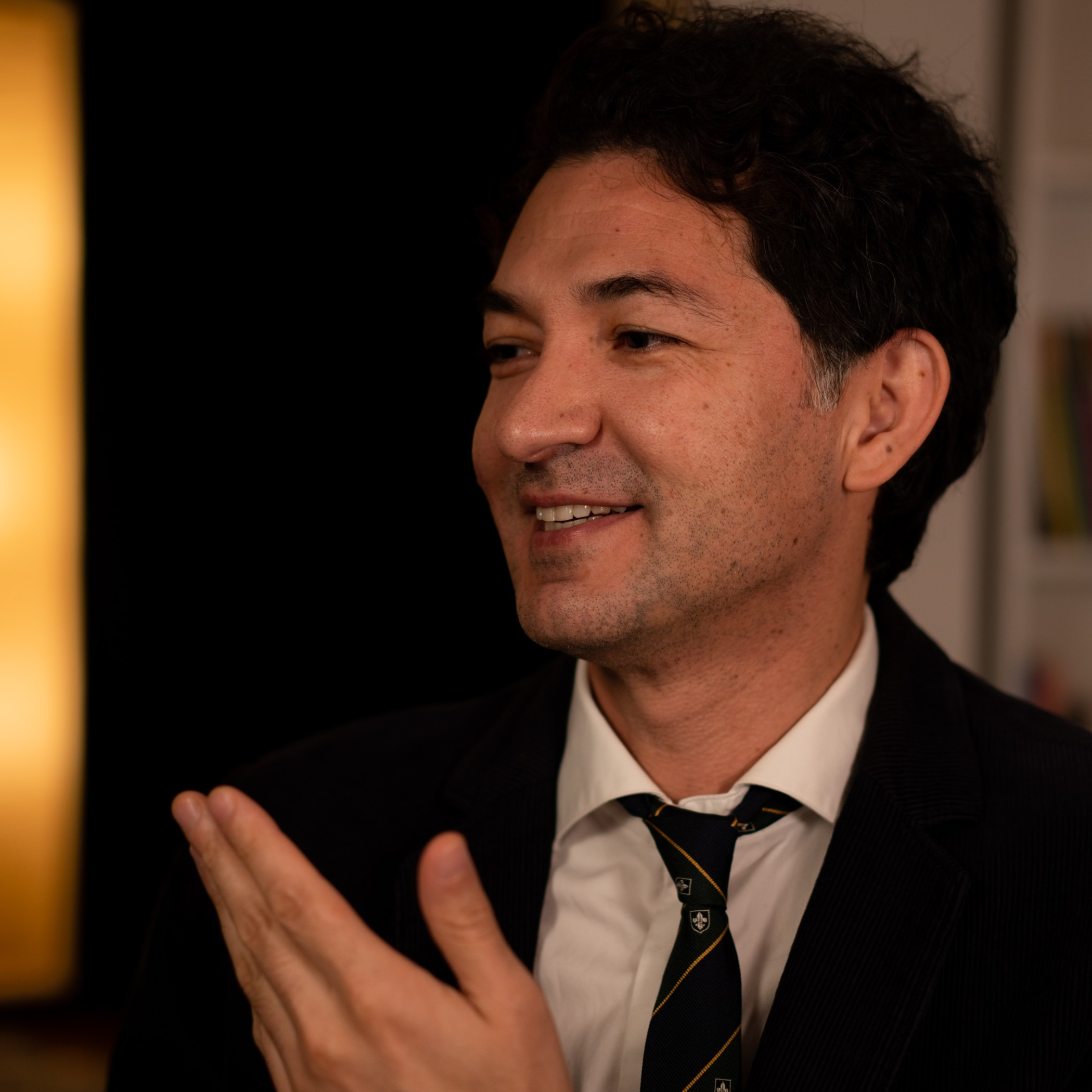
- Born: 1980 (age 45–46); Balkh Province, Afghanistan
- Education: Kabul University; University of Erfurt
- Occupations: Poet, journalist, academic
- Website: asefhossaini.com

Sayed Asef Hossaini (Persian: سید عاصف حسینی; born 1980 in Balkh, Afghanistan) is an Afghan–German academic researcher, poet, novelist, and political editor. He studied philosophy and sociology at Kabul University before completing a doctorate in international conflict management in Germany. As a poet, Hossaini has published several collections of poetry in Persian. His verse often combines classical Persian imagery with modernist techniques and explores themes of dark romance, political reality, displacement, identity, and memory. In addition to his literary work, he has published novels in German and Persian, pursued research on governance and conflict, and served as an editor of political affairs for Afghan and international media.

== Early life and education ==
S. Asef Hossaini (also known as Asef Hossaini and Sayed Asef Hossaini) was born in 1980 in Balkh Province, Afghanistan. He grew up in Iran as a Cold-war refugee. At the age of nine, Hossaini began working in antique oriental carpet repair, a craft he practiced for 14 years. He finished high school in Mashhad and moved to Kabul in 2003 to study philosophy and sociology at Kabul University, where he became active in literary circles and published his two poetry collections.

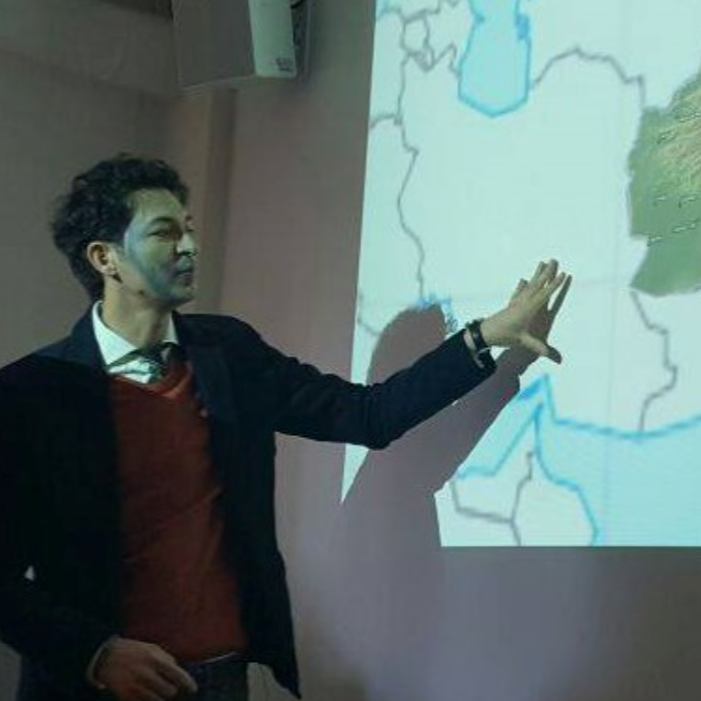
S. Asef Hossaini at his PhD defence, Willy Brandt School of Public Policy, 2017.

After moving to Germany, Hossaini pursued graduate studies at the Willy Brandt School of Public Policy, completing a doctorate in international conflict management magna cum laude in 2017.

== Career ==
=== Academia and journalism ===
His academic work has focused on local governance and rural politics of Afghanistan in the post-2001 period.

Alongside his research, Hossaini has been active in journalism and media. He worked as an editor for a project at Media in Cooperation and Transition (MICT) in Berlin in 2010, and from 2011 to 2023 he was employed at the German international broadcaster Deutsche Welle (DW) in Bonn. In 2021–2022 he served as launch director of Afghanistan International TV's digital service, and in 2023–2024 he was launching director and head of the Digital Pashto department.
Based in Berlin, Hossaini is also engaged in nonprofit and cultural initiatives. He is a co-founding director of Abad e. V., a German nonprofit association supporting Afghan vulnerable communities in Germany and Afghanistan.

=== Poetry ===
Hossaini has published several poetry collections in Persian, with selections translated into English in international journals such as Guernica and Asymptote. His verse has drawn comparisons to Persian modernists such as Forugh Farrokhzad and Sohrab Sepehri, as well as to international voices including César Vallejo, Pablo Neruda, Octavio Paz, Mahmoud Darwish, and Adonis. His poetry combines classical Persian imagery with modernist techniques, and often intertwining dark romance with political reality.

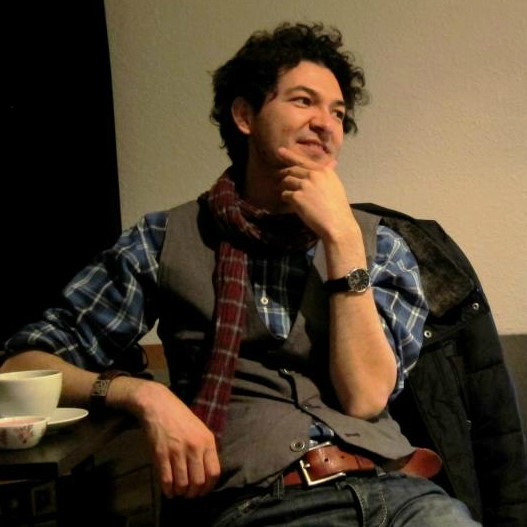
S. Asef Hossaini during a private poetry reading in 2013.

Intimacy and politics are central to Hossaini's poetry. His work is marked by lyrical intensity, compressed language, and layered imagery that often blends private experience with historical trauma. Love poems frequently carry undertones of displacement and collective memory, producing a voice where dark romance intersects with political reality. Rooted in the Persian literary tradition, his poems draw on classical motifs—night, dream, loss—yet reframe them through modernist techniques.

Critics like Abutalib Mozaffari note affinities with Forugh Farrokhzad, whose confessional style combined personal candor with social critique, and with Sohrab Sepehri, whose contemplative lyricism opened Persian poetry to modernist aesthetics and existential questions. Like these figures, Hossaini situates individual longing within broader reflections on exile, identity, and the fragility of belonging.

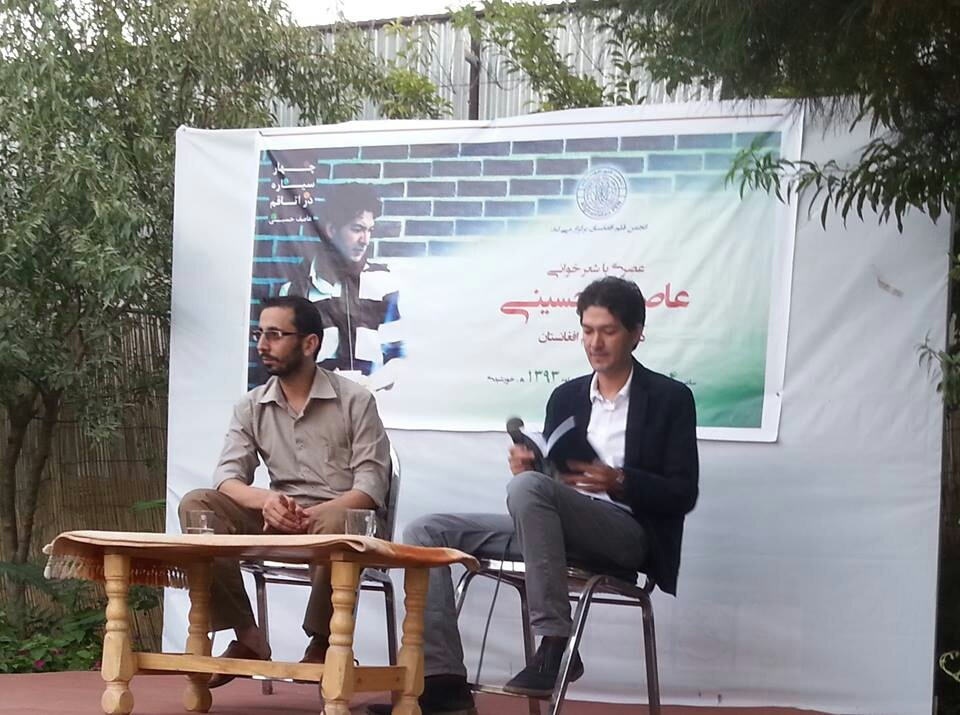
Reading at PEN Afghanistan, 2014

In translation, reviewers have connected his work to international voices such as César Vallejo and Mahmoud Darwish for their blending of lyrical imagery with the experience of exile, and to Adonis for the metaphysical questioning that underlies everyday images. Mandana Zandian, a critic has also noted affinities with Nezar Qabbani and Mahmoud Darwish, whose poetry similarly merges intimacy with political and philosophical reflection. Like these Latin American poets, Hossaini's verse shifts between sensual imagery and historical consciousness, creating a dual register of personal longing and collective memory.

== Social and political activities ==
In addition to his literary and academic work, Hossaini has been active in Afghan civic and political life.

In 2005, he was nominated as a candidate for the parliamentary elections in Afghanistan. From 2005 to 2008 he participated in the Young Leaders Forum, an initiative of the Friedrich Ebert Stiftung that promoted youth political engagement and leadership. He was also a co-founder of the Afghanistan Students’ Movement at Kabul University (2004–2005), which advocated democratic values and national interests in the turbulent political landscape of the post-Taliban era.

In Germany, he has continued to participate in social and cultural initiatives of the Afghan diaspora. He is the co-founding director of Abad e. V., a nonprofit association in Berlin that supports Afghan communities through cultural projects, advocacy, and civic education.

== Works ==
=== Poetry collections ===
- چهار سیاره در اتاقم [Four Planets in my Room] (in Persian). Self-published. 2012.
- من در اثر ماه‌گرفتگی [I, Child of Lunar Eclipse] (in Persian). Erfan Publishing Institute. 2007.
- این کفش‌های پیاده [These Walking Shoes] (in Persian). 2007.

=== Novels ===
- خون خوابم را باطل نکرد [Blood Did Not Break My Dream] (in Persian). Sweden: Taak & Cafe 60 Media. 2025.
- Persönliche Liebe, globalisiertes Leid (in German). Vienna: Lifebiz20 Verlag. 2022.
- روزهای آخر پاییز [Last Days of Autumn] (in Persian). Kabul: Friedrich Ebert Stiftung Afghanistan Office. 2007.

== Academic research ==
- Doctoral dissertation on international conflict management, focusing on the power structures in Afghanistan's rural communities — Erfurt University, 2017.
- Afghanistan's Perian literature in transition: creative writing and war (2001–2021) - Transcript Verlag, 2024.
- Local governance in Afghanistan: a solution to a failed state? – Orient, 2022.
- Locality and power: a methodological approach to Afghan rural politics – Routledge, 2019.
- How social media is changing Afghan society – Heinrich Böll Stiftung, 2018.
- Afghanistan diaspora and brain drain (German) - German Federal Agency for Civic Education (bpb), 2013.
- The role of tribes (German) - German Federal Agency for Civic Education (bpb), 2013.
- Afghan youth between tradition and modernity (German) - German Federal Agency for Civic Education (bpb), 2013.
