= Jörg Rüpke =

German classical philologist and religious studies scholar

Jörg Rüpke (born 27 December 1962 in Herford, West Germany) is a German scholar of comparative religion and classical philology, recipient of the Gay-Lussac Humboldt Prize in 2008, and of the Advanced Grant of the European Research Council in 2011. In January 2012, Rüpke was appointed by German Federal President Christian Wulff to the German Council of Science and Humanities.

== Education ==
Rüpke studied comparative religions, Latin and theology at the University of Bonn, Lancaster University and the University of Tübingen. He received his Ph.D. in 1989 from Tübingen University with a thesis on the religious construction of war in Rome, and remained at the university for a habilitation thesis on the Roman calendar. Rüpke received his venia legendi in Comparative Religions in 1994, to which he added the venia legendi in Philology the following year.

== Career ==
Rüpke taught Latin at the University of Potsdam between 1995 and 1999, when he became Professor for Comparative Religions at the University of Erfurt. From 2000 to 2008, he chaired the German Research Foundation Priority Program 1080 Roman Imperial and Provincial Religions, of which many notable religious scholars were part. In 2006–08, Rüpke was part of the German Research Foundation Research Training Group 896 Concepts of the Divine and of the World, chaired by Hermann Spieckermann at the University of Göttingen. Since 2008, he has acted as co-director alongside Hans Joas for the Humanities Centre for Advanced Studies' Religious Individualization in Historical Perspectives project as well as fellow at the Max Weber Center for Advanced Cultural and Social Studies, Erfurt. He chairs the Graduate School in Erfurt for “Religions in Modernization Processes”.

Rüpke held numerous fellowships at foreign universities and research centers: he was guest lecturer at the Sorbonne, Paris, in 2004; Webst-Lecturer at Stanford University, CA, in 2005; fellow of the Humanity Council at Princeton University, NJ, in 2009; visiting professor at the Collège de France, Paris, and Aarhus University in 2010; as well as honorary professor of Aarhus University and visiting professor at the University of Chicago in 2011.

He received the Gay Lussac-Humboldt Price for German-French co-operation in 2008 for his outstanding research in the area of Roman religion and his notable collaboration with French scholars, as well as the Price of the Deutsche Börsenverein in 2010. In November 2011, the European Research Council (ERC) announced its decision to fund Rüpke's project Lived Ancient Religion at Erfurt University with an Advanced Grant, which promotes further studies on Ancient Religion in Erfurt.

In January 2012, the German head of state appointed Rüpke to the Council of Science and Humanities to advise the government on questions of academical developments.

Rüpke was dean of the philosophical faculty from 2004 to 2007, followed by the interim presidency of the University of Erfurt from 14 January 2008 to 1 July 2008, when he was succeeded by Kai Brodersen. He received the Thuringia Research Award for basic research in 2012 and was appointed to the Academia Europaea in 2013.

== Publications ==
- Jörg Rüpke 1990. Domi militiae: Die religiöse Konstruktion des Krieges in Rom, Stuttgart: Steiner.
- Jörg Rüpke 1995. Kalender und Öffentlichkeit: Die Geschichte der Repräsentation und religiösen Qualifikation von Zeit in Rom. (Religionsgeschichtliche Versuche und Vorarbeiten 40), Berlin: de Gruyter.
- Barchiesi, Alessandro; Jörg Rüpke; Susan Stephens (edd.) 2004. Rituals in Ink: A Conference on Religion and Literary Production in Ancient Rome, Held at Stanford University in February 2002 (Potsdamer altertumswissenschaftliche Beiträge 10), Stuttgart: Steiner.
- Clifford Ando, Jörg Rüpke (eds.) 2006. Religion and Law in Classical and Christian Rome (Potsdamer altertumswissenschaftliche Beiträge 15), Stuttgart: Steiner.
- Corinne Bonnet, Jörg Rüpke, Paolo Scarpi (eds.) 2006. Religions orientales – culti misterici: Neue Perspektiven – nouvelle perspectives – prospettive nuove (Potsdamer altertumswissenschaftliche Beiträge 16), Stuttgart: Steiner.
- Jörg Rüpke 2007. Religion of the Romans. Trsl. and ed. by Richard Gordon. Cambridge: Polity Press.
- Jörg Rüpke (ed.) 2007. A Companion to Roman Religion. Blackwell Companions to the Ancient World. Malden, MA/Oxford: Blackwell.
- Jörg Rüpke 2008. Fasti sacerdotum: A Prosopography of Pagan, Jewish, and Christian Religious Officials in the City of Rome, 300 BC to AD 499. Biographies of Christian Officials by Anne Glock. Trsl. by David Richardson. Oxford: Oxford University Press.
- Jörg Rüpke, John Scheid (eds.) 2009. Bestattungsrituale und Totenkult in der römischen Kaiserzeit / Rites funéraires et culte des morts aux temps impériales (Potsdamer altertumswissenschaftliche Beiträge 27), Stuttgart: Steiner.
- Jörg Rüpke 2011. The Roman Calendar from Numa to Constantine: Time, History, and the Fasti. Trsl. David M. Richardson. Boston: Wiley-Blackwell.
- Jörg Rüpke 2011. Von Jupiter und Christus: Religionsgeschichte in römischer Zeit, Darmstadt: Wissenschaftliche Buchgesellschaft.
- Jörg Rüpke 2012. Rationalization and Religious Change in Republican Rome. Philadelphia: University of Pennsylvania Press.
- Jörg Rüpke 2014. From Jupiter to Christ.On the History of Religion in the Roman Imperial Period. New York: Oxford University Press.
- Jörg Rüpke 2016. Religious Deviance in the Roman World. Superstition or Individuality? Cambridge: Cambridge University Press,
- Jörg Rüpke 2018. Pantheon: A New History of Roman Religion Princeton University Press.
