= Thomas Armbrüster =

German economist and college professor (born 1968)

- Born: 1968 (age 56–57); Bremen, Germany
- Education: Technische Universität Berlin, (Professor, 2005); London School of Economics (Ph.D., 1999)
- Occupations: Economist and College Professor (Philipps-Universität Marburg)
- Website: www.thomas-armbruester.com

Thomas Armbrüster (born 1968 in Bremen) is a German economist and college professor.

== Life ==
After completing his Abitur Armbrüster joined the German Bundeswehr as regular soldier. He then studied Business Administration and Engineering at Technische Universität Berlin. Afterwards Armbrüster worked for a business consulting company, until he, in 1999, earned his Ph.D. from the London School of Economics and Political Science. His thesis was titled The German corporation: An open or closed society? An application of Popperian ideas to organizational analysis. He joined different activities at the University of Reading, at Stanford University and at the University of Mannheim until he, in 2005, qualified as a professor at Technische Universität Berlin.

From 2005 to 2008 Armbrüster held the professorial chair for generic economy at the Witten Institute for family businesses at the Witten/Herdecke University. In addition to this Ambrüster, from 2007 until 2008, was dean of the faculty for economy. 2008 until 2009 he was president and executive director at the German Graduate School of Management and Law in Heilbronn. In 2010 he moved to the Quadriga College Berlin and was Professor for strategy and human resource management at the faculty for management and economics. Since 2005 Armbrüster works as management coach especially in the area of leadership of employees and generic leadership. He is partner at the Prof. Armbrüster Leadership Services GmbH. He also was management coach at the Munich Executive Institute. In 2001 and again in 2004 Armbrüster received the Academy of Management Best Paper Award.

Since 2006 he is Adjunct Faculty in the department of Organizational Behavior and Leadership at the Mannheim Business School. In early 2006 until the end of 2014 he held the chair for strategic management at the political science faculty at the University of Erfurt. There he also taught at the associated faculty Willy Brandt School of Public Policy. Since 2014 he is professor for knowledge management at the Philipps University of Marburg.

== Research focuses ==
Armbrüsters research focuses are in the areas of human resource management, leadership of employees, generic leadership and business consulting.

== Publications (selection) ==
- Personalmanagement als Beruf (with Katharina Schüller), Helios, Berlin 2011.
- Unternehmensberatung im öffentlichen Sektor (with Johannes Banzhaf and Lars Dingemann), DUV Gabler, Wiesbaden 2010, ISBN 978-3-8349-2304-2.
- The Economics and Sociology of Management Consulting, Cambridge University Press, Cambridge 2006, ISBN 978-0521142243.
- Management and Organization in Germany, Ashgate, London 2005, ISBN 0-7546-3880-4.
- Unternehmensberatung (with Christoph Barchewitz), DUV/Gabler, Wiesbaden 2004, ISBN 3-8244-8135-9.
