= Eisenach Charterhouse =

Former monastery in Thuringia

Coordinates: 50°58′4″N 10°19′26″E

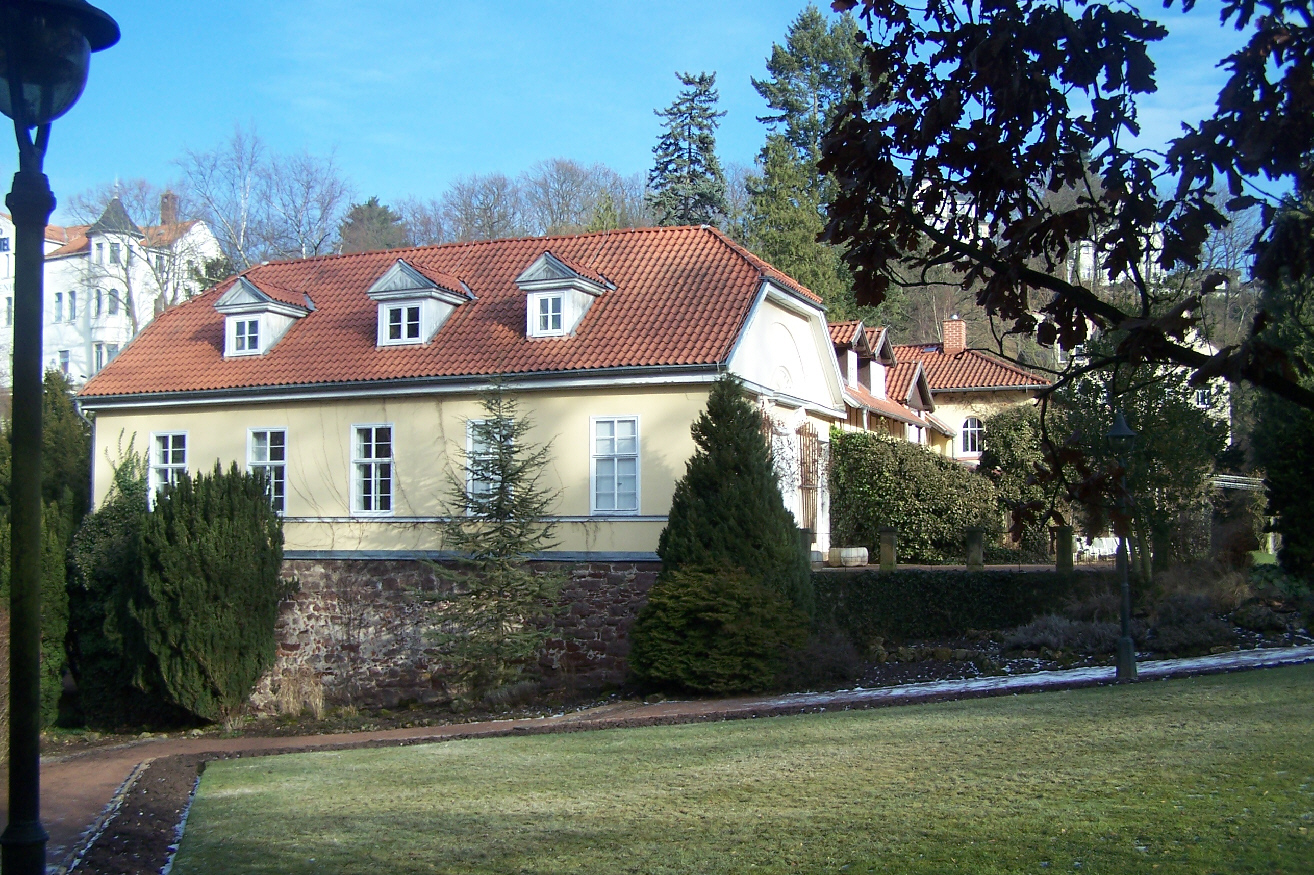
The gardener's house in the charterhouse garden contains the last structural remains of the monastery

Eisenach Charterhouse (German: Kartause Eisenach) is a former charterhouse, or Carthusian monastery, in Eisenach in Thüringia, Germany, founded in 1378 and suppressed in 1525.

== History ==
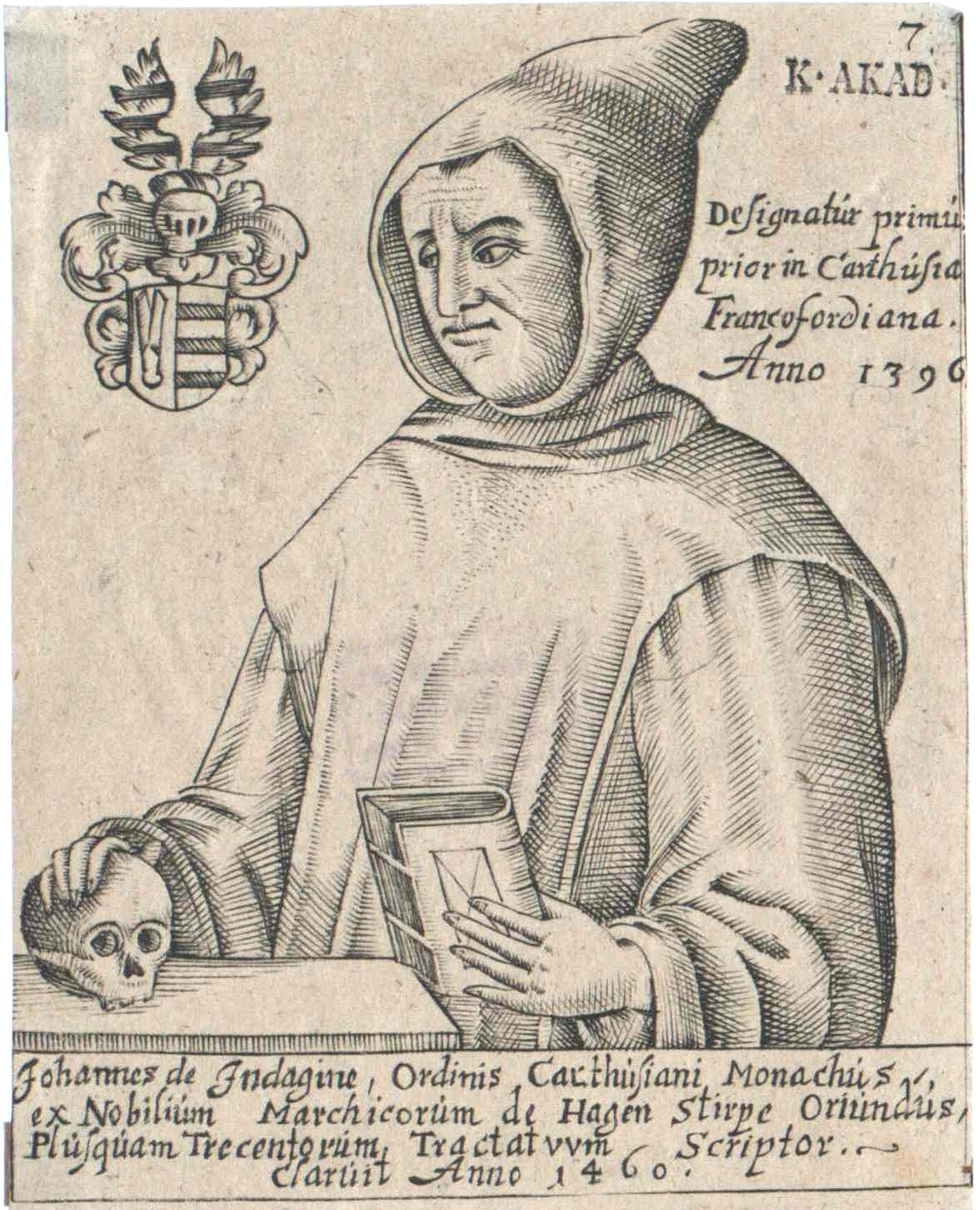
Johannes de Indagine

The charterhouse Domus Vallis Sanctae Elisabeth, dedicated to Saint Elizabeth of Hungary (by her marriage Landgravine of Thuringia), was established in Eisenach in 1378 with the support of Landgraves Frederick III and Balthasar and of William I, Margrave of Meissen. The first monks arrived in the years from 1378 to 1383 from Erfurt Charterhouse. The monastic premises were sited just outside the town of Eisenach, in front of the Frauentor ("women's gate") to the south of the town. In 1382 the Carthusian Chapter General officially accepted the new foundation into the order.

The charterhouse flourished in the 14th and 15th centuries. Prominent scholars of Scholasticism originated here, such as Johannes de Indagine (real name Johann Bremer von Hagen, 1415−1475), who was prior of Eisenach from 1454 to 1456, and later prior of Erfurt Charterhouse. His successor Heinrich Nemritz (prior 1457−1474), served from 1477 to 1482 as General Visitor of the Lower German province of the Carthusian Order.

The Reformation divided the monks. In the early 1520s some had already become adherents of the teachings of Martin Luther.

=== Dissolution and later use ===
In the "Eisenacher Pfaffensturm" ("Eisenach Priest Storm") on 24 April 1525, the buildings were looted and badly damaged. The monks and nuns from all monastic houses in Eisenach were driven from the town. The charterhouse was dissolved and its premises were confiscated by the Elector John. The Elector John Frederick I had the secularised monastery repaired by 1537 and used it as a country house.

During the Thirty Years' War it was looted.

In 1694 Duke John George II of Saxe-Eisenach established an orphanage and a textile mill in the buildings. The garden was used as a ducal kitchen garden. Between 1717 and 1721 a new prison and orphanage (Zucht- und Waisenhaus) was set up alongside a cloth manufactory. After the orphanage was closed in 1819, the buildings were used as a house of correction.

Around 1790 the court gardener Johann Georg Sckell successfully transformed the former ducal kitchen garden into a landscape garden, which was given its present form as the Charterhouse Garden from 1845 by Hermann Jäger (1815−1890).

== Buildings ==
The gardener's house in the centre of the charterhouse garden with its Neoclassical "tearoom", contains the last remains of the monastery.

== Bibliography ==
- Sönke Lorenz (ed.): Bücher, Bibliotheken und Schriftkultur der Kartäuser - Festgabe zum 65. Geburtstag von Edward Potkowski, Franz Steiner Verlag, Stuttgart 2002, ISBN 3-515-08093-7
- Gottfried Kühn: Das Karthäuserkloster in Eisenach, Verlag Kahle, Eisenach 1896
- Joseph Kremer (1905), "Beiträge zur Geschichte der klösterlichen Niederlassungen Eisenachs im Mittelalter", Quellen und Abhandlungen zur Geschichte der Diözese Fulda (in German), vol. II, Fulda: Fuldaer Aktiendruckerei, pp. 128–164
