= Winfried Brugger =

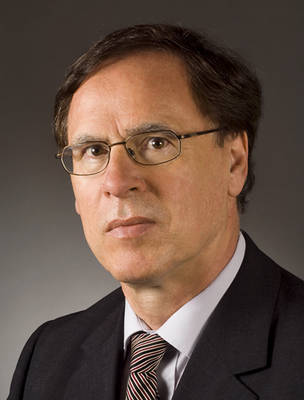
Winfried Brugger

Winfried Brugger (26 February 1950 in Tettnang, West Germany – 13 November 2010 in Heidelberg, Germany) was Professor of Public Law, Philosophy of Law and Theory of State at Heidelberg University.

Brugger studied law, philosophy and sociology at the Universities in Munich and Tuebingen. After completing his Ph.D. (Dr. iur.) at Tuebingen University with the prize-winning book Menschenrechtsethos und Verantwortungspolitik. Max Webers Beitrag zur Analyse und Begruendung der Menschenrechte (1980), he then studied at the University of California, Berkeley, obtaining the degree of LL.M. in 1981. Thereafter, he published comparative articles and books on German and American constitutional law and theory and the philosophy of law.

After finishing his Habilitation in Tuebingen in 1986, he became a Professor for Public Law at the University of Mannheim in 1987 and in 1992 moved on to his present position at the University of Heidelberg. His American teaching experience included visiting professorships at Georgetown University Law Center (1985, 1991–92, 1998–99, 2001, 2004, 2007), the University of Houston Law Center (1995), the University of San Francisco (2002) and the University of San Diego (2005). Winfried Brugger was also a Fellow at the Max Weber Center for Advanced Cultural and Social Studies at Erfurt University in Germany, associate director of the Heidelberg Center for American Studies (HCA), and President of the German Section of the International Association for Social and Legal Philosophy (IRV).

Brugger was author and editor of 17 books and wrote 220 articles and book reviews. Many of his publications focus on human rights in general and free speech issues (hate speech) in particular, judicial review, theories of interpretation, liberalism and communitarianism, constitutional law in times of emergency, and theories of good decisionmaking. In Germany, he reviewed new decisions of the U.S. Supreme Court and was co-editor of the Newsletter of the German-American Lawyers Association.

== Selected publications ==
- Liberalismus, Pluralismus, Kommunitarismus. Baden-Baden: Nomos, 1999. ISBN 3-7890-6215-4
- Einfuehrung in das oeffentliche Recht der USA. Frankfurt/Muenchen: Beck, 2nd ed. 2001. ISBN 3-406-47704-6
- Demokratie, Freiheit, Gleichheit. Studien zum Verfassungsrecht der USA. Berlin: Duncker & Humblot, 2002. ISBN 3-428-10827-2
- Freiheit und Sicherheit. Eine staatstheoretische Skizze mit praktischen Beispielen. Baden-Baden: Nomos, 2004. ISBN 3-8329-0808-0
- Das anthropologische Kreuz der Entscheidung in Politik und Recht. Baden-Baden, 2. Aufl. 2008. ISBN 978-3-8329-3697-6
- Religion in the Public Sphere: A Comparative Analysis of German, Israeli, American and International Law. Berlin/Heidelberg/New York: Springer, 2007 (co-edited with Michael Karayanni). ISBN 978-3-540-73355-3
- Rechtsphilosophie im 21. Jahrhundert. Frankfurt a.M.: Suhrkamp, 2008 (co-edited with Ulfrid Neumann and Stephan Kirste). ISBN 978-3-518-29494-9.
- Dignity, Rights, and Philosophy of Law within the Anthropological Cross of Decision-Making, in: 9 German Law Journal No. 10 (1 October 2008),
- The Treatment of Hate Speech in German Constitutional Law (Parts I and II).
