= Johannes de Indagine =

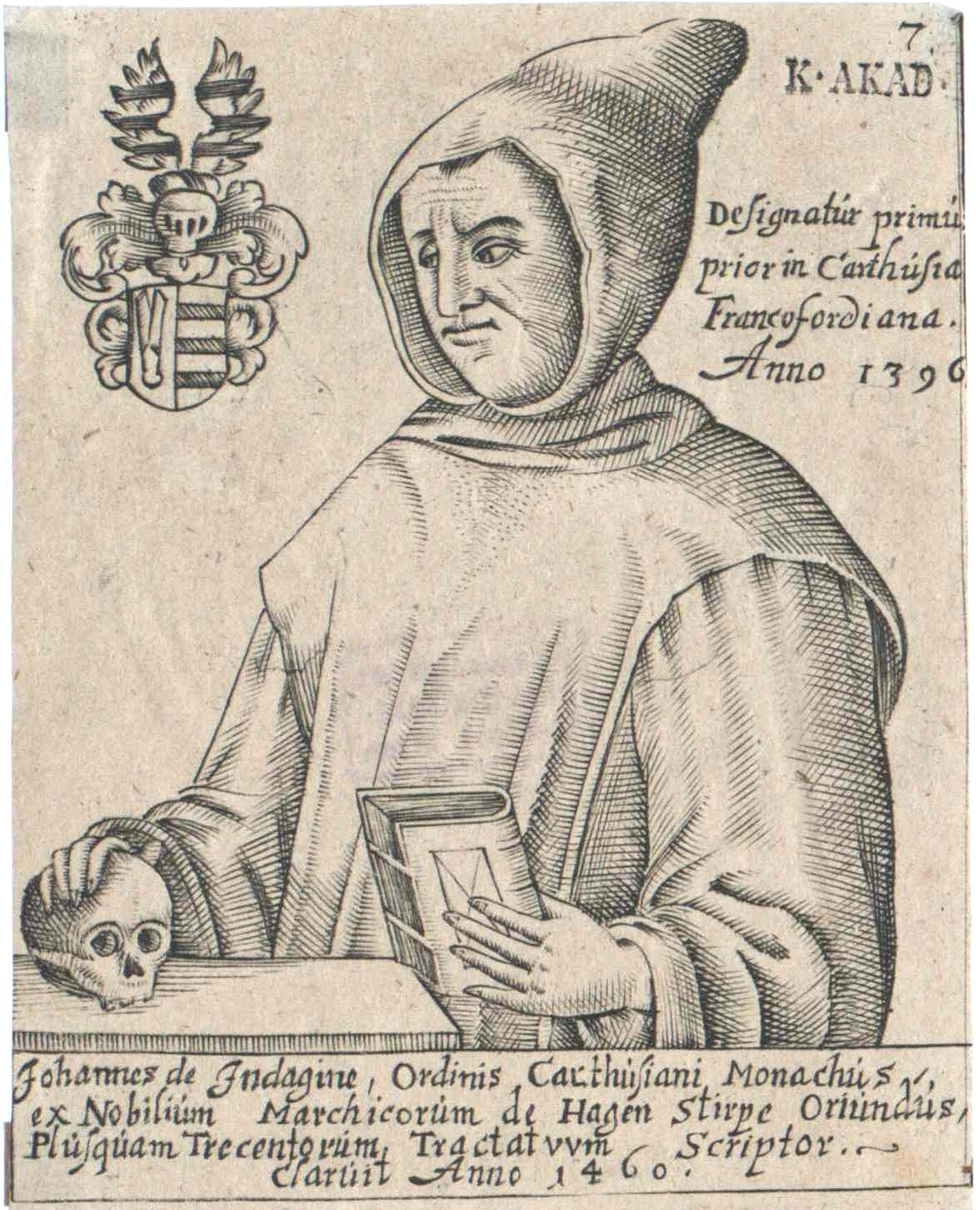
Johannes de Indagine

Johannes de Indagine, also known as Johannes Indaginis, John of Hagen, otherwise Johannes Bremer von Hagen (c. 1415–1475) was a German Carthusian monk, Catholic theologian and theological author.

== Life ==
Johannes de Indagine was born in around 1415 in Hattendorf in Auetal near Stadthagen in what is now Lower Saxony as Johannes Bremer (or Brewer or Bräuer). He matriculated at the University of Erfurt in 1436 to study law as Johannes Bremer von Hagen.

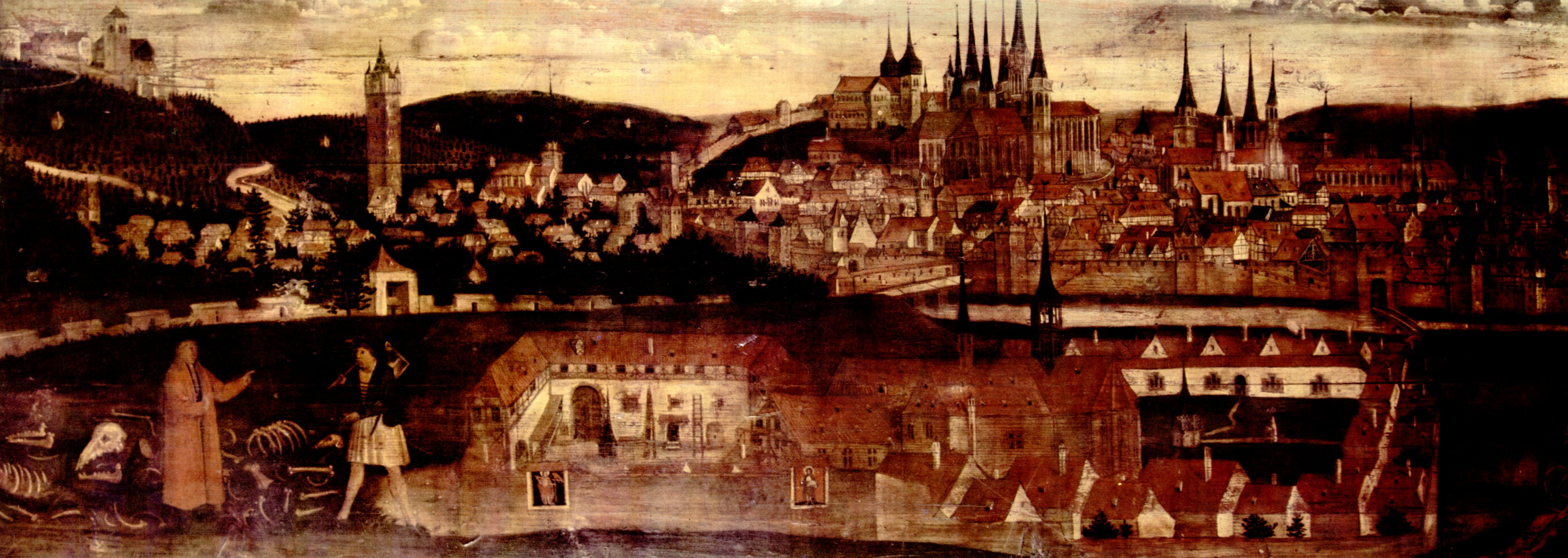
Erfurt Charterhouse in a representation of its foundation legend (c. 1525, tempera on panel)

In 1440 he entered the Carthusian Order at Erfurt Charterhouse. From 1454 to 1456 he was prior of Eisenach Charterhouse. In 1457 he was recalled to his home monastery in Erfurt as prior. From 1461 to 1464 he was head of the charterhouses of Frankfurt an der Oder and Grabow near Stettin. In 1465 he returned once more to Erfurt, this time as a simple monk, where he dedicated himself for the rest of his life to theological study and writing.

Johannes acted as an advisor in theological and legal matters to bishops, princes and scholars. Even the University of Erfurt and theologians such as Johannes von Wesel (1425−1481) and Johannes von Dorsten (1420−1481) sought his advice.

He opposed abuses in ecclesiastical life and was a champion of the reform of the church and religious orders. Towards the end of his life he wrote that he had probably written over 500 works. His written commentaries on the text of the Bible comprise 80 volumes, but the greater part of his writings were not printed.

== Literature ==
- Joseph Klapper: Der Erfurter Kartäuser Johannes Hagen: ein Reformtheologe des 15. Jahrhunderts. 2 Bände, St. Benno-Verlag, Leipzig 1960 u. 1961
- Erich Kleineidam (1974). "Indaginis, Johannes". Neue Deutsche Biographie (in German). Vol. 10. Berlin: Duncker & Humblot. pp. 169–169. (full text online).
