= John Scheid =

French historian (born 1946)

John Scheid (born 1946 in Luxembourg under the first name Jean) is a French historian. A specialist of ancient Rome, he has been a professor at the Collège de France since 2001.

== Biography ==
After his secondary studies in Luxembourg, John Scheid came to France in 1966 in order to study history and classical letters first at the University of Strasbourg and then in Paris, where he was a pupil of Hans-Georg Pflaum. He obtained a 3rd cycle thesis scholarship that he led under the direction of Robert Schilling and which he supported in 1972 in Strasbourg. (Les Frères arvales : recrutement et origine sociale sous les Julio-Claudiens)

Wishing to go to Rome as part of the École française de Rome, he had to pass the agrégation. He obtained the necessary French naturalization in January 1973, in time to enroll in the competition of that year. He was received at the agrégation de grammaire. He left for Rome in 1974 and in 1975 began excavations in the district of La Magliana, carried out regularly until 1988 (and afterwards in 1997–98).

From 1977 to 1983, he was an assistant at the University of Lille-3, then became director of studies at the École pratique des Hautes Études (EPHE), section of religious sciences.

In 1987, he defended his doctoral thesis, Romulus et ses frères : Le culte des frères arvales, modèle du culte public dans la Rome des empereurs (‘Romulus and his brothers: The worship of the Arval Brethren, a model of public worship in imperial Rome’).

Since 2001, he has been a professor at the College de France, in charge of a chair Religion, institutions et société de la Rome antique (‘Religion, institutions, and society of ancient Rome’). He is also co-director of the excavation of Djebel Oust in Tunisia, coordinator of the experimental excavation of a necropolis at Classe near Ravenna, and coordinator of the Fana Templa Delubra : Corpus des lieux de culte dans l'Italie antique project.

He is codirector of the Revue d'histoire des religions and member of the board of editors of numerous journals: Archives de sciences sociales des religions, Archiv für Religionsgeschichte (Teubner, Stuttgart-Leipzig), Potsdamer Althistorische Beiträge, Historia, Millenium and Mythos.

According to historian Jean-Louis Voisin, John Scheid "revolutionized [...] the study and approach of the Roman religion by insisting on the precise fulfillment of its rites and its civic character".

== Honours and awards ==
=== Honours ===
- 2013 : Knight of the Legion of Honour (France)
- 2016 : Officier of the Ordre des Palmes Académiques (France)
- 2020 : Grand Officier of the Order of Merit of the Grand Duchy of Luxembourg
- 2021 : Commander of the Ordre des Palmes Académiques (France)

=== Awards ===
- 2020 : Prix Saintour
- 2015 : Emile Girardeau Prize of the Académie des Sciences Morales et Politiques
- 2016 : Medal of the Collège de France

=== Acknowledgement ===
- Member of the Académie des Inscriptions et Belles-Lettres
- Member of the Academia Europaea
- Corresponding member of the Grand Ducal Institute
- Corresponding fellow of the British Academy

=== Honorary degrees ===
- 2006 : University of Erfurt
- 2013 : University of Chicago

== Publications ==
=== Books ===
- 1972 : Les frères arvales. Recrutement et origine sociale sous les Julio-Claudiens, Paris, ed. Presses Universitaires de France.
- 1983 : Religion et piété à Rome, Paris, ed. La Découverte, 1985, 158 p. ISBN 2-7071-1530-4. (First published in Italian under the title La religione a Roma, Bari, Laterza).
- 1990 : Romulus et ses frères Le collège des frères arvales, modèle du culte public dans la Rome des empereurs, Rome, ed. Bibliothèque des Écoles Françaises d'Athènes et de Rome, vol. 275, 806 p. ISBN 978-2226121349.
- 1990 : Le collège des frères arvales. Étude prosopographique du recrutement (69-304), Rome, ed. Écoles Françaises de Rome.
- 1998 : Commentarii fratrum arvalium qui supersunt. Les copies épigraphiques des protocoles annuels de la confrérie arvale (21 av.-304 ap. J.-C.), Rome, ed. Écoles Françaises de Rome.
- 2001 : Religion et piété dans la Rome antique, Paris, ed. Éditions Albin Michel, 2001, 192 p. ISBN 978-2226121349.
- 2001 : Chaire de religion, institutions et société de la Rome antique, Paris, ed. Collège de France, series "Leçon inaugurale". ISBN 978-2722600713.
- 2002 : La religion des Romains, Paris, ed. Armand Colin, 2002, 176 p. ISBN 978-2200263775
- 2005 : Quand faire, c'est croire, Paris, ed. Aubier, « Collection historique ».
- 2007 : Res Gestae Diui Augusti. Hauts Faits du Divin Auguste, Paris, ed. Les Belles Lettres.
- 2011 : Pouvoir et religion à Rome, Paris, ed. Pluriel.
- 2012 : À Rome sur les pas de Plutarque, Paris, ed. Vuibert.
- 2015 : Les Dieux, l'État et l'individu. Réflexions sur la religion civique à Rome, Paris, ed. Seuil.
- 2017 : La religion romaine en perspective, Paris, ed. Collège de France.
- 2018 : Tra epigrafia e religione romana. Scritti scelti, editi e inediti, tradotti e aggiornati, Roma, ed. Quasar.
- 2019 : Ad Deam Diam. Ein heiliger Hain in Roms Suburbium, Stuttgart, ed. Steiner Verlag, 2019.
- 2019 : Rites et religion à Rome, Paris, ed. CNRS.
- 2020 : Infographie de la Rome antique (with Nicolas Guillerat), Paris, ed. Passés Composés.
- 2023 : Les romains et leurs religions. La piété au quotidien, Paris, ed. Cerf.

=== Collective works ===
- 1992: Jerzy Kolendo; Jean-Michel Carrié; Claude Nicolet; John Scheid; Aldo Schiavone; Yvon Thébert; Paul Veyne; Jean-Paul Morel; Andrea Giardina (1992). L'Homme romain. L'univers historique. Paris: Éditions du Seuil. p. 477. ISBN 978-2020123365.
- 1995: Hanoune, Roger; Scheid, John (1995). Nos ancêtres les Romains. “Découvertes Gallimard” (nº 259). Paris: Éditions Gallimard. p. 176. ISBN 978-2070531592.
- 1998: John Scheid, Paola Tassini, Jörg Rüpke, Recherches archéologiques à la Magliana : Commentarii fratrum arvalium qui supersunt. Les copies épigraphiques des protocoles annuels de la confrérie arvale (21 av.–304 ap. J.-C.), École française, Rome, ISBN 2-7283-0539-0.
- 2002: Lyne Bansat-Boudon (dir.); John Scheid (dir.) (2002). Le Disciple et ses maîtres. Genre humain. collectif. Paris: Éditions du Seuil. p. 258. ISBN 978-2020541527.
- John Scheid, Henri Broise, Le balneum des frères arvales, École française, Roma, 1987, ISBN 2-7283-0149-2.
- 2003: Scheid, John; Svenbro, Jesper (2003). Le métier de Zeus : Mythe du tissage et du tissu dans le monde gréco-romain. Paris: Éditions Errance. p. 135. ISBN 978-2877722414.
- 2009: Jörg Rüpke, John Scheid, Bestattungsrituale und Totenkult in der römischen Kaiserzeit/Rites funéraires et culte des morts aux temps impériales (Potsdamer altertumswissenschaftliche Beiträge 27), Stuttgart: Steiner.
- 2010: Scheid, John; Jacques, François (5 May 2010). Rome et l'intégration de l'Empire (44 av. J.-C.–260 ap. J.-C.). Nouvelle Clio. Vol. 1. Paris: Presses Universitaires de France. p. 480. ISBN 978-2130582472.

=== Articles ===
See a detailed list on the site of ANHIMA.

- John Scheid, "Politique et religion dans la Rome antique. Quelle place pour la liberté de culte dans une religion d’État ?", La Vie des idées, 28 June 2011.
