= Erfurt Charterhouse =

Former Carthusian monastery in Erfurt, Germany

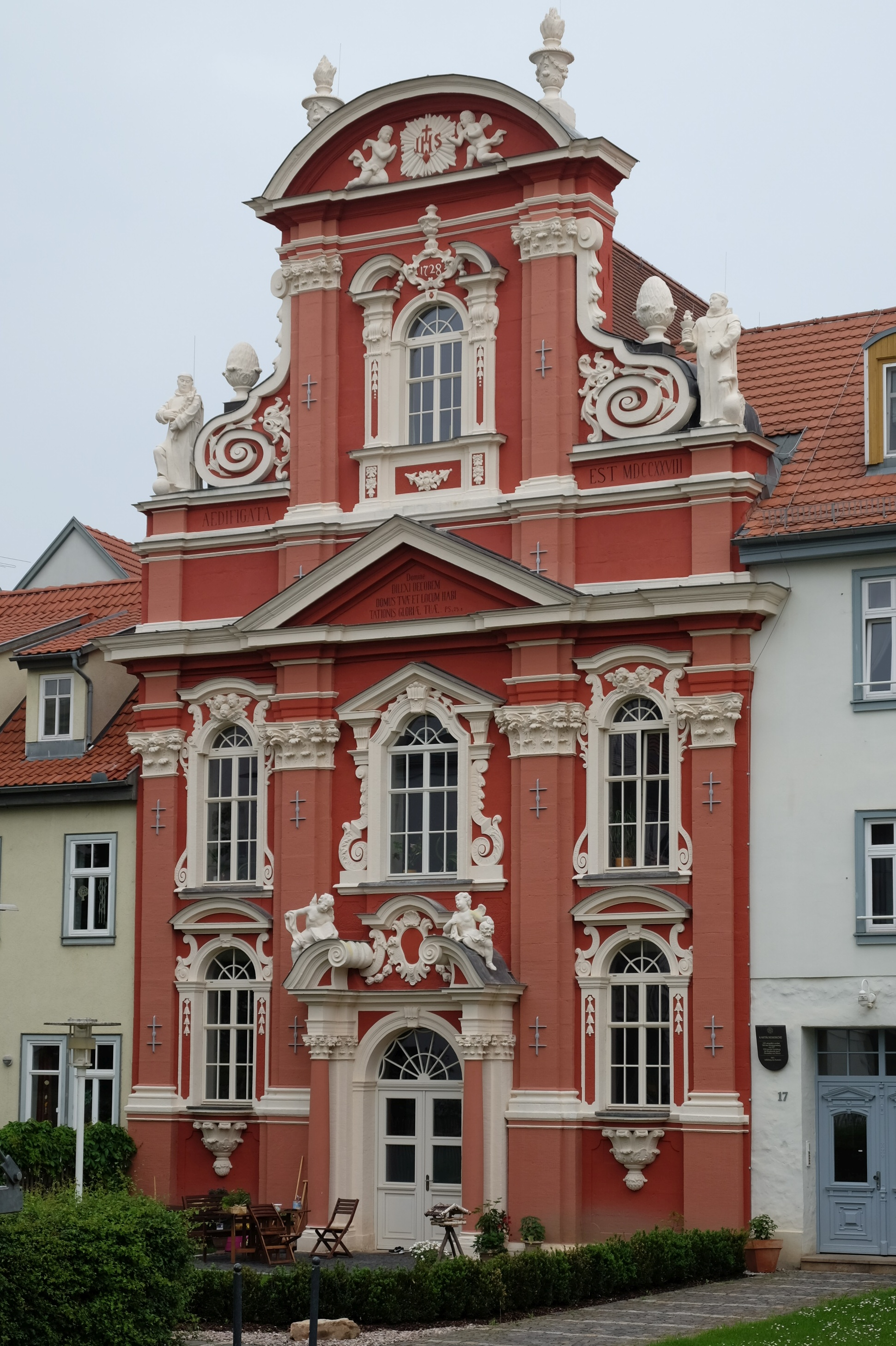
West front of the former Carthusian church

Erfurt Charterhouse (German: Kartäuserkloster Erfurt, Kartäuserkloster St. Salvatorberg; Latin: Domus montis Sancti Salvatoris) is a former charterhouse, or Carthusian monastery, in Erfurt, Thuringia, Germany. It was founded in the 1370s: building works began in 1372 and the monastery was accepted into the Carthusian Order in 1374. Work started on the church in 1375.

The monastery quickly attracted rich endowments and prospered so much that it was able to launch the foundations of two new charterhouses, Eisenach Charterhouse in 1383 and Hildesheim Charterhouse in 1387.

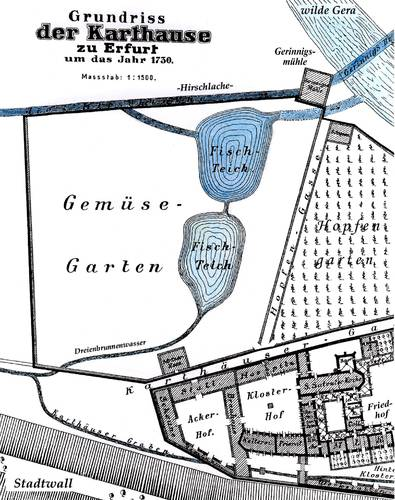
Plan of the monastery site in around 1730

The charterhouse survived the Reformation but was much reduced. It was looted in the Peasants' War, the Thirty Years' War and finally at secularisation in 1803, and nothing survived of its once-substantial treasury. Its library however passed to the University of Erfurt.

The original Gothic buildings (cloisters, cells, chapter room and chapel) were much augmented by Baroque construction in the 18th century.

The premises were mostly destroyed by fire in 1845. The church survives but was radically converted to residential use in 2012.

== Bibliography ==
- Joachim Kurt: Die Geschichte der Kartause Erfurt, Montis Sancti Salvatoris, 1372−1803, Verlag Institut für Anglistik und Amerikanistik der Universität Salzburg, Salzburg 1989
- Joseph Klapper: Der Erfurter Kartäuser Johannes Hagen, St. Benno-Verlag, Leipzig 1960
