= Max Weber Center for Advanced Cultural and Social Studies =

Max Weber Center for Advanced Studies
- Max-Weber-Kolleg for kultur- und sozialwissenschaftliche Studien
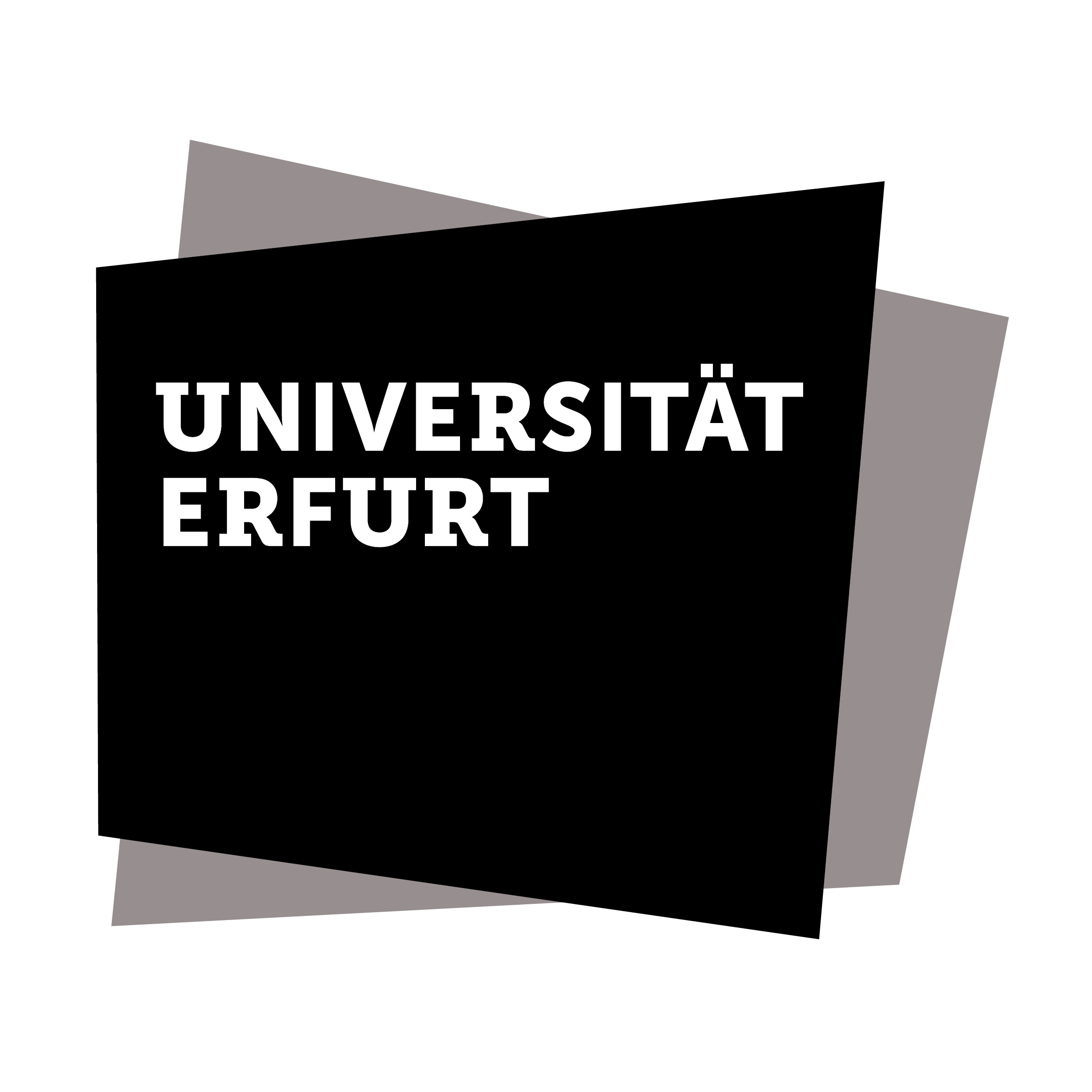
- Logo of University of Erfurt
- Type: Public Institute
- Established: 1998
- Director: Hartmut Rosa (Director) and Jörg Rüpke (Vice-Director)
- Location: Erfurt, Thuringia, Germany
- Campus: Urban
- Website: Max Weber Center (English)
- Data as of July 2015

The Max Weber Center for Advanced Studies (German: Max-Weber-Kolleg für kultur- und sozialwissenschaftliche Studien) is an international and interdisciplinary "high-ranking research centre which forms an avant-garde institution of the University of Erfurt," according to the European Commission's CORDIS. The Center's focal areas include "religion, science, and law as powers of interpretation and governance; interactions among cultures; social orderings and mentalities in radical change; and normative—in particular, ethical—issues."

With its distinctive organizational structure, this semi-autonomous, faculty-like research institute combines features of an Institute for Advanced Study with those of a Graduate School or Research Training Group (Graduiertenkolleg). Scientists from several disciplines, including sociology, history, philosophy, theology, religious studies, law, and economics, are appointed as temporary fellows. During their time at the Max Weber Center, fellows conduct their own research and supervise doctoral and postdoctoral researchers (Kollegiaten). This arrangement brings together established and early-career scholars for collaborative research and academic training.

== History ==
Following Wolfgang Schluchter, who had been the Center's dean since its founding, in 1998, the renowned sociologist Hans Joas became Max-Weber-Professor and hence the new dean of the Center in 2002. In early 2011, Joas was appointed Permanent Fellow at the Freiburg Institute for Advanced Studies (FRIAS) but remained an associated member of the Max Weber Center and spokesman of the Center's research group "Religiöse Individualisierung in historischer Perspektive" ("Religious individualization in historical perspective"). In May 2011, ancient historian and religious scholar Wolfgang Spickermann was appointed Interim Dean of the Max Weber Center. In October 2013, the sociologist and political scientist Hartmut Rosa then became the Center's new director (Direktor).

From 1997 until 2012, Erfurt's Kunstgewerbeschule ("School of Arts and Crafts") housed the Max Weber Center in the old city, at Am Hügel 1, before the University proceeded to move the Center closer to its main campus, into Haus 27 – Gelände Helios Klinikum. Beginning in 2010, debate has ensued concerning the Center's future, especially its degree of autonomy from the university—a discussion that has found widespread coverage in local and even national media.

== Reputation and rankings ==
Hosting distinguished academics and winning much external funding, the Max Weber Center has a strong reputation both at home and abroad. In 2008, only ten years after its grounding, the German Council of Science and Humanities distinguished the Center as one of only nine "excellent" institutes for sociological research, out of more than 250. The Max Weber Center thus numbers among the top 4% of German research institutes dedicated to sociology and related disciplines. In 2015, the Center received a major grant of more than 1.4 million euros from the European Commission's COFUND program, to be distributed over five years.

== Fields of study ==
Historical, comparative, and interdisciplinary in nature, scholarship at the Max Weber Center finds its inspiration in the work of its eponym, Max Weber. The Center thus organizes its intellectual program with special attention to theoretical reflexivity, historical depth, and normative questions. Within this conceptual framework, the Center concentrates on three core fields of research: "the hermeneutic and orienting capacities of religion, law and science"; "the interactions between cultures, societal orders and mentalities during periods of radical social change"; and "action-theoretical principles in cultural and social sciences, and their linkages to and impacts on normative and, especially, ethical, questions." These three broader fields have more concrete expression in three specific areas of academic inquiry, formalized as "Normativity and Social Critique," "Space-Time Regimes and Social Order," and "Religious Transformation."

With their own dissertation and habilitations projects, members of the graduate school (Kollegiaten) concentrate on various aspects of this research program in collaboration with the Center's fellows. This cooperation proceeds from "the presumed inextricability of teaching and research" as well as "the principle of task-specific teamwork." Governing its own doctoral programs, the Center confers its own degrees, whose specific designations depend on the respective area of study: Dr. rer. pol., Dr. jur., or Dr. phil.

== Internal research units ==
The Max Weber Center houses several longterm internal research units. They include the Kierkegaard Research Unit, which coordinates the German edition of Soren Kierkegaard's works, the Meister Eckhart Research Unit, and the Johann Gottfried Herder Research Unit. The Max Weber Center also participates in the Interdisciplinary Center of E-Humanities in History and Social Sciences (ICE).

== Special research projects ==
In addition to its standard research program, the Max Weber Center has also attracted substantial external support for special research projects.

=== Current projects ===
- Lived Ancient Religion: Questioning "cults" and "polis religion" (2012–2017), financed through the European Research Council,
- Religiöse Individualisierung in historischer Perspektive ("Religious Individualization in Historical Perspective")(2008–2017), a research group composed of graduate school members and funded by the German Research Foundation,
- Die lokale Politisierung globaler Normen ("Local Politicization of Global Norms"), supported by the Thuringia Ministry for Education, Scholarship, and Culture,
- The Sanctuary Project, a program sponsored by the Anneliese Maier Prize awarded to Greg Woolf,
- Ordering Dynamics, provisioned by the State Excellence Initiative of Thuringia,
- Dynamik ritueller Praktiken im Judentum in pluralistischen Kontexten von der Antike bis zur Gegenwart ("Dynamics of Jewish Ritual Practices in Pluralistic Contexts from Antiquity to the Present"), subsidized by the Federal Ministry of Education and Research,
- Religiöse Rituale in historischer Perspektive ("Religious Rituals in Historical Perspective"), backed by the German Research Foundation.

=== Past projects ===
- Herrschaft in Südosteuropa – kultur- und sozialwissenschaftliche Perspektiven ("Authority in Southeastern Europe: Cultural and Social Perspectives"), a research network funded by the German Research Foundation,
- Jüdisches Sprachdenken: The German-Jewish Contribution to Modern Linguistic and Cultural Theory, underwritten by the German-Israeli Foundation,
- Graduate School (Graduiertenkolleg) Menschenwürde und Menschenrechte. Entstehung, Entwicklung und Anwendung eines zentralen Wertkomplexes der Moderne ("Human Dignity and Human Rights. Formation, Development, and Application of a Central Value Complex of Modernity"), a joint project with the Ethics Center at the University of Jena and backed by the German Research Foundation,
- Sprachdenken und politische Theorie. Jüdisch-deutsche Beiträge vom 18. bis 20. Jahrhundert ("Language Thinking and Political Theory. German-Jewish Contributions from the 18th to 20th Century"), an international research network in cooperation with the Van Leer Institute in Jerusalem and subsidized by the German Research Foundation,
- Graduate School (Graduiertenkolleg) Religion in Modernisierungsprozessen ("Religion in Modernization Processes"), provisioned by several different sources,
- Mobilisierung von Religion in Europa ("The Mobilization of Religion in Europe"), sponsored by the Federal Ministry of Education and Research,
- Die elementaren Diskurse der Gabe. Marcel Mauss' paradigmatische Wirkung auf die Sozial- und Kulturtheorien ("The Elementary Discourses of the Gift: Marcel Mauss' Paradigmatic Influence on Social and Cultural Theory"), supported by the German Research Foundation
- Collective Identity, Democracy, Protest and Social Movements, funded by the German-Israeli Foundation for Scientific Research and Development,
- Kontingenz und Moderne. Sozialphilosophische, ideengeschichtliche und historisch-soziologische Dimensionen ("Contingency and Modernity. Socio-Philosophical, Idea-Historical, and Historico-Sociological Dimensions"), financed through the Volkswagen Foundation.

== Notable figures ==
Noted fellows, past and present, include the following figures:

- sociologists Hans Joas and Wolfgang Schluchter,
- historians Michael Borgolte and Wolfgang Reinhard,
- religious scholars Hans G. Kippenberg and Jörg Rüpke,
- theologians Hermann Deuser and Friedrich Wilhelm Graf,
- economists Hans G. Nutzinger and Gert G. Wagner,
- legal scholars Winfried Brugger and Horst Dreier,
- philosophers Johann Arnason and Theo Kobusch.

Additionally, distinguished visiting scholars have included, for instance, sociologists Shmuel N. Eisenstadt (1998, 1999, 2000, and 2001), Toby Huff (2000), and Paul Lichterman (2009), indologist Sheldon Pollock (2001), as well as historians Paolo Prodi (2007–2008) and Dan T. Carter (2009). In 2012, one of the Center's most prominent fellows, the historian of religion Jörg Rüpke, was appointed member of the German Council of Science and Humanities.
