= Amplonius Rating de Berka =

German physician, educator and book collector

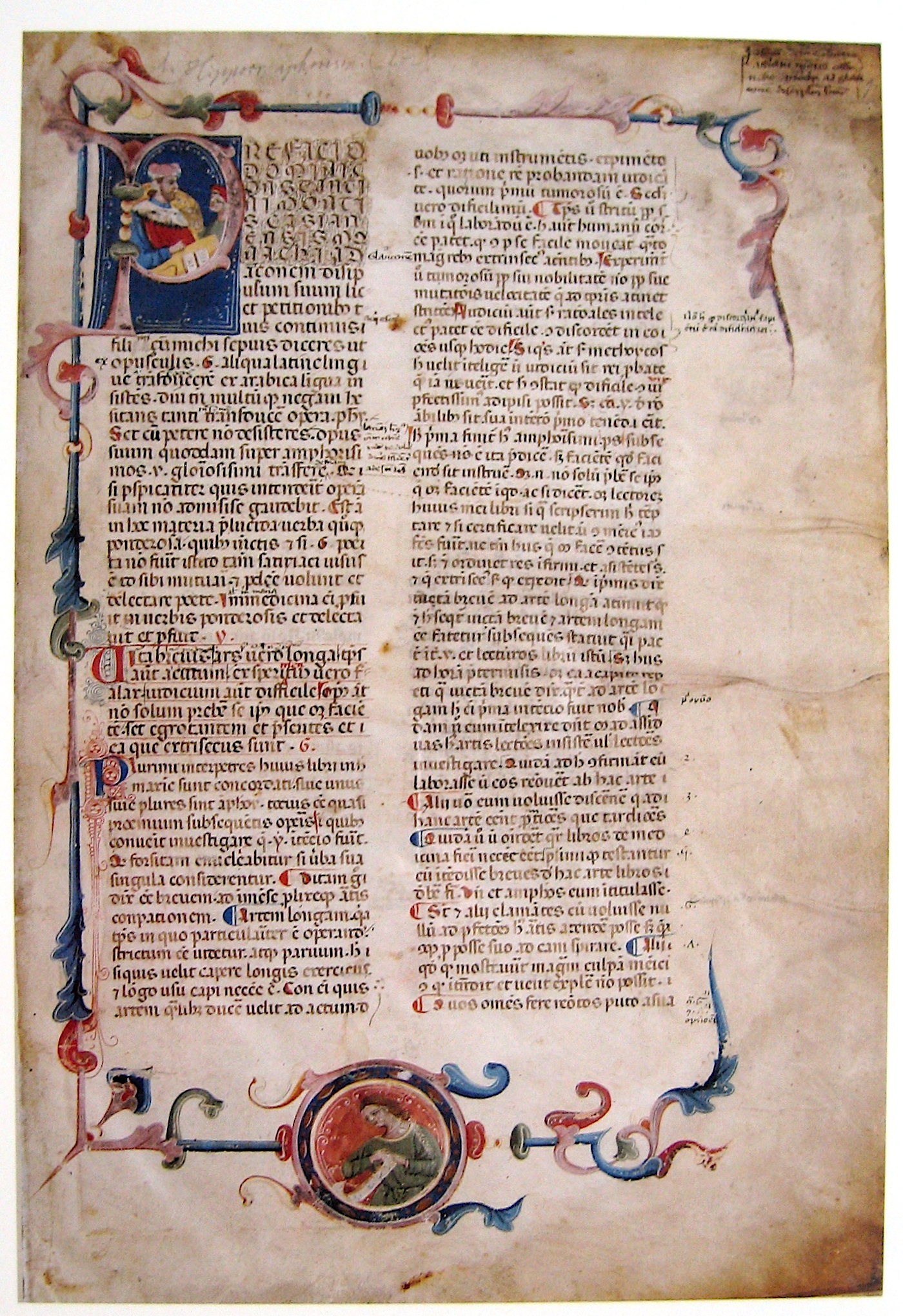
A page from a copy made in Italy around 1350 of Constantine the African's translation of a work of Hippocrates with commentary by Galen, acquired by Amplonius and still in the Bibliotheca Amploniana today

Amplonius Rating de Berka (c. 1365 – 1435), also called Amplonius de Fago or Amplonius von Berka, was a German physician, educator and book collector.

Amplonius was born around 1365 in Rheinberg. His family came from Ratingen. He married Kunigunde from Hagen. They had two sons and two daughters: Amplonius, who received his Master of Arts from the University of Erfurt in 1421 and became a canon of Cologne Cathedral in 1438; Dionysius, a canon of Bonn; Helena; and Agnes. Both daughters joined the Poor Clares at Mainz. Kunigunde agreed to a divorce in 1412, so that Amplonius could take major orders. She was still living in 1433.

Amplonius received his Master of Arts from the University of Prague in 1387. He began studying medicine at the University of Cologne in 1391 and received his doctorate of medicine from Erfurt in 1393. In 1394, he was elected rector of Erfurt. In 1395, he went to teach at the University of Vienna. In 1399, he was elected rector of Cologne. He taught medicine there until his death.

In 1412, Amplonius founded a new college at Erfurt, the Collegium Amplonianum, to which he donated his personal library, the Bibliotheca Amploniana. He compiled a catalogue of his collection, listing 635 volumes, containing about 4,000 works. Today, it is part of the municipal library of Erfurt and the largest surviving manuscript collection from late medieval Germany. In 1415, Amplonius became a canon of the cathedral. Between 1417 and 1423, he served as dean of collegiate church of Saint Victor in Mainz. He died around Eastertime 1435 in Cologne.
