= Hans Joas =

German sociologist and social theorist (born 1948)

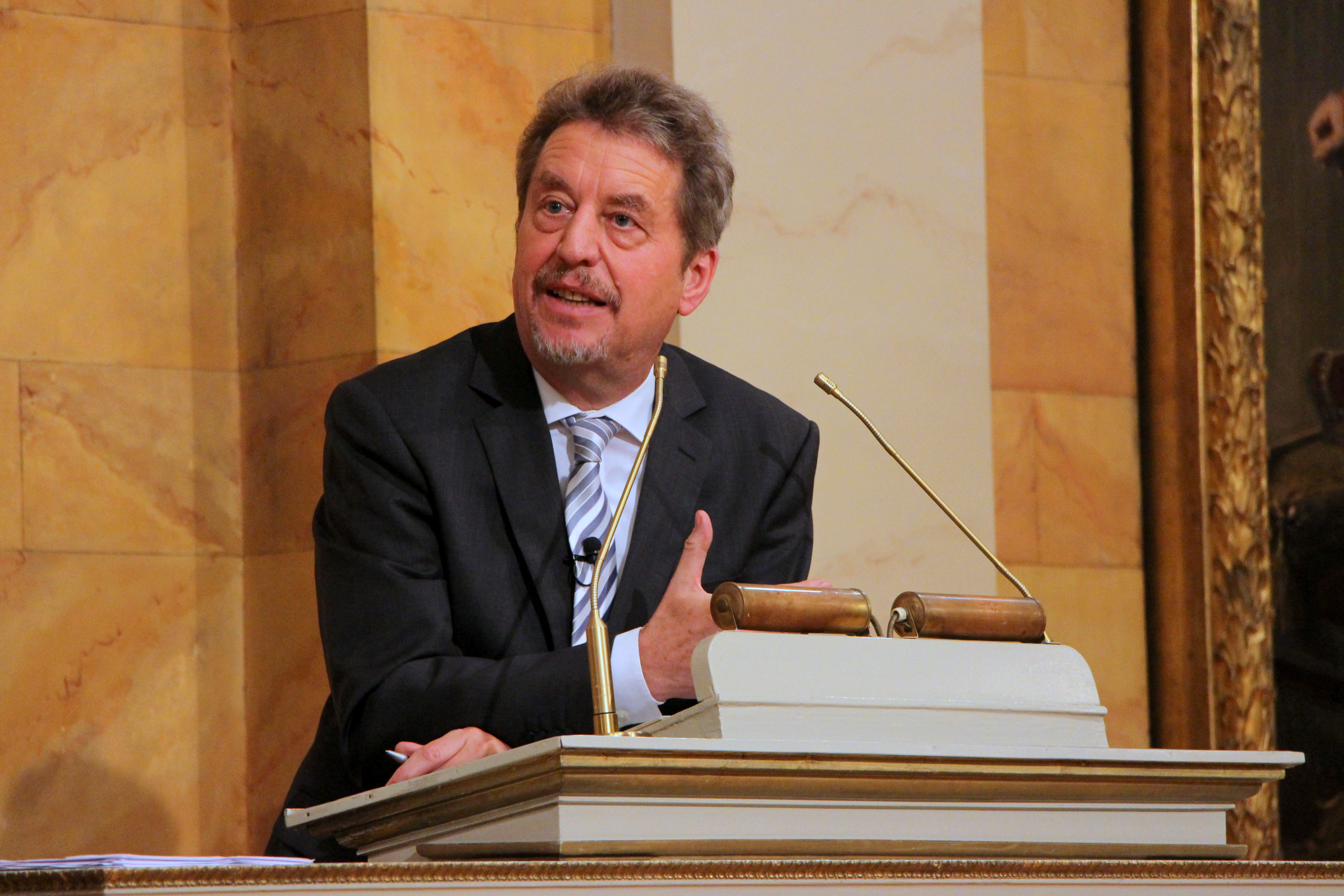
- Hans Joas (2014)
- Born: November 27, 1948 (age 77); Munich, Bavaria, Germany

Education
- Education: Free University of Berlin (PhD, 1979)
- Thesis: Praktische Intersubjektivität: Die Entwicklung des Werkes von George Herbert Mead (1979)
- Doctoral advisor: Hans Peter Dreitzel

Philosophical work
- Era: Contemporary philosophy
- Region: Western philosophy
- School: Pragmatism
- Institutions: University of Chicago
- Main interests: Social philosophy

Hans Joas (/ˈjoʊɑːs/; German: [ˈjoːas]; born November 27, 1948) is a German sociologist and social theorist.

Since 2014, Hans Joas has been Ernst Troeltsch Professor for the Sociology of Religion at the Humboldt University of Berlin. From 2011 until 2014, he was a Permanent Fellow at the Freiburg Institute for Advanced Studies (FRIAS); from 2002 until 2011, he was the Director of the Max Weber Center for Advanced Cultural and Social Studies at the University of Erfurt. Since 2000, he has also been Visiting Professor of Sociology and Social Thought and a Member of the Committee on Social Thought at the University of Chicago. Hans Joas is Ordinary Member of the Berlin-Brandenburgische Akademie der Wissenschaften.

== Life ==
Joas studied sociology, philosophy, history, and German literature at LMU Munich from 1968 to 1971, and at the Free University of Berlin from 1971 to 1972, ultimately obtaining a diploma in sociology. From 1973 to 1977, he was a Wissenschaftlicher Assistent (research and teaching fellow) in the department of sociology at the Free University of Berlin. In 1979, he obtained a Dr. phil. at the Free University of Berlin under the supervision of Hans Peter Dreitzel.

From 1979 to 1983, Hans Joas served as a research fellow at the Max Planck Institute for Human Development and Education in Berlin. During this period, he was also a visiting professor at the University of Tübingen from 1980 to 1981. In 1981, he completed his habilitation.

Between 1984 and 1987, Joas was awarded the Heisenberg Fellowship by the German Research Council (Deutsche Forschungsgemeinschaft). In 1985, he spent the spring quarter as a Visiting Professor in the Department of Sociology at the University of Chicago. The following year, in the summer quarter of 1986, Joas was a Visiting Professor at the University of Toronto’s Department of Sociology.

From 1987 to 1990, he held a Professor of Sociology position at the University of Erlangen–Nuremberg. In 1990, Joas joined the Free University of Berlin as a Professor of Sociology, where he remained until 2002. In 1993, Joas was appointed Executive Director of the John F. Kennedy Institute for North American Studies at the Free University of Berlin, a position he held until 1995. During this time, he was also a Fellow at the Swedish Collegium for Advanced Study in the Social Sciences and a Visiting Professor at Uppsala University in the spring of 1992. Later, in the fall semester of 1994, he was a Fellow at the Indiana University Institute for Advanced Study in Bloomington, Indiana.

In 1996, he was a Visiting Professor in the Department of Sociology at the University of Wisconsin–Madison in the fall semester. The following year, in 1997, he served as the Theodor Heuss Professor at the New School for Social Research in New York, offering his expertise in sociology. During 1998, he continued his teaching and research as a Visiting Professor at Duke University in Durham, North Carolina, and again at the University of Wisconsin–Madison in the fall semester.

Between 1999 and 2000, Joas was again a Fellow at the Swedish Collegium for Advanced Study in the Social Sciences in Uppsala, Sweden. In 2000, he became a Professor in the Department of Sociology and a Member of the Committee on Social Thought at the University of Chicago.

From 2002 to 2011, Joas served as the Director of the Max Weber Center for Advanced Cultural and Social Studies at the University of Erfurt in Germany. In 2002, he was also a Visiting Professor at the University of Vienna’s Department of Sociology during the fall semester. The following year, from 2004 to 2005, Joas held the prestigious Ernst Cassirer Professorship at the Swedish Collegium for Advanced Study in the Social Sciences in Uppsala, Sweden.

In 2005 to 2006, he was a Fellow at the Wissenschaftskolleg zu Berlin. The spring semester of 2007 saw him as a Visiting Professor at both the University of Vienna’s Department of Sociology and Faculty of Catholic Theology. Joas returned to Sweden in 2010 as a Fellow at the Swedish Collegium for Advanced Study in Uppsala.

In 2011, Joas was a Fellow at the Stellenbosch Institute for Advanced Study (STIAS) in Stellenbosch, South Africa, and was also a Permanent Fellow at the Freiburg Institute for Advanced Studies (FRIAS) at the University of Freiburg, Germany, from 2011 to 2014. During the spring semester of 2014, he was a Fellow at the University of Gothenburg in Sweden, holding the Torgny Segerstedt Professorship. In 2012, Joas was the first scholar to be Visiting Professor of the Joseph Ratzinger Pope Benedikt XVI. Foundation at the University of Regensburg. The topic of his lectures was "Sacralization and Secularization".

Since 2014, Joas has held the Ernst Troeltsch Professor for the Sociology of Religion at the Faculty of Theology at Humboldt University of Berlin. In 2017, he returned to Stellenbosch for another term as a Fellow at STIAS in the spring semester and later that year in May, became a Fellow at Peking University’s Institute of Humanities and Social Sciences. In 2022, Joas was appointed the International Jakob Fugger Visiting Professorship at the University of Augsburg in Germany.

== Academic awards ==
- 2010: Bielefelder Wissenschaftspreis ("Niklas-Luhmann-Preis").
- 2012: Werner Heisenberg medal of the Alexander von Humboldt-Stiftung.
- 2012: Doctor honoris causa, University of Tübingen.
- 2013: Doctor honoris causa, Uppsala University.
- 2013: Hans-Kilian-Award.
- 2015: Distinguished Lifetime Achievement Award, American Sociological Association, Section History of Sociology.
- 2015: Max-Planck-Research-Award.
- 2017: Prix Paul Ricœur.
- 2017: Meckatzer Philosophy Award
- 2018: Recipient of the Theological Award Salzburg.
- 2022: Recipient of the Distinguished Lifetime Achievement Award of the German Sociological Association.
- 2022: Doctor honoris causa, Pázmány Péter Catholic University in Budapest.
- 2024: Foreign corresponding member of the Accademia delle Scienze dell'Istituto di Bologna.
- 2024: Appointment as Commander of the Pontifical Order of St. Gregory

== Bibliography ==
=== In English ===
- George Herbert Mead. A Contemporary Re-examination of His Thought (MIT Press 1985, ISBN 978-0-262-10033-5).
- Social Action and Human Nature (with Axel Honneth) (Cambridge University Press 1988, ISBN 978-0-521-33935-3).
- Pragmatism and Social Theory (University of Chicago Press 1993, ISBN 978-0-226-40042-6).
- The Creativity of Action (University of Chicago Press 1996, ISBN 978-0-226-40044-0).
- The Genesis of Values (University of Chicago Press 2000, ISBN 978-0-226-40040-2).
- War and Modernity (Blackwell 2003, ISBN 978-0-745-62644-4).
- Social Theory (with Wolfgang Knoebl) (Cambridge University Press 2009, ISBN 978-0-521-87063-4).
- Do We Need Religion? On the Experience of Self-Transcendence (Paradigm 2009, ISBN 978-1-594-51439-5).
- The Benefit of Broad Horizons: Intellectual and Institutional Preconditions for a Global Social Science (with Barbro Klein) (Brill 2010, ISBN 978-90-04-19284-3)
- War in Social Thought: Hobbes to the Present (with Wolfgang Knoebl) (Princeton University Press 2012, ISBN 978-0-691-15084-0).
- The Sacredness of the Person: A New Genealogy of Human Rights (Georgetown University Press 2012, ISBN 978-1-589-01969-0).
- The Axial Age and Its Consequences (with Robert Bellah) (Harvard University Press 2012, ISBN 978-0-674-06649-6).
- Faith as an Option: Possible Futures for Christianity (Stanford University Press 2014, ISBN 978-0804792776).
- The Timeliness of George Herbert Mead (with Daniel R. Huebner) (University of Chicago Press 2016, ISBN 9780226376943).
- The Power of the Sacred: An Alternative to the Narrative of Disenchantment (Oxford University Press 2021, ISBN 978-0-19-093330-2).
- Moral Change and the Ambiguity of Religions: Christianity between Racism and the Struggle against It (The Wittrock Lecture Book Series III) (Swedish Collegium for Advanced Study 2023, ISBN 978-91-981948-4-5).
- Under the Spell of Freedom. Theory of Religion after Hegel and Nietzsche (Oxford University Press 2024, ISBN 978-0-19-764215-3).
- Why the Church? Self-Optimization or Community of Faith (Stanford University Press 2024, ISBN 978-1-5036-3803-7).
- The Oxford Handbook of Émile Durkheim (editor, with Andreas Pettenkofer) (Oxford University Press 2024, ISBN 978-0-19-067935-4).
- The Anthem Companion to Karl Jaspers (editor, with Matthias Bormuth) (Anthem Press 2025, ISBN 978-1-83999-286-5)

=== In German ===
- Was ist die Achsenzeit? Eine wissenschaftliche Debatte als Diskurs über Transzendenz (Schwabe Verlag, Basel 2014, ISBN 978-3-7965-3360-0).
- Die lange Nacht der Trauer. Erzählen als Weg aus der Gewalt? (Psychosozial-Verlag, Giessen 2015, ISBN 978-3-8379-2267-7).
- Sind die Menschenrechte westlich? (Kösel, München 2015, ISBN 978-3466371266).
- Kirche als Moralagentur? (Kösel, München 2016, ISBN 978-3-466-37175-4).
- Im Bannkreis der Freiheit. Religionstheorie nach Hegel und Nietzsche (Suhrkamp 2020, ISBN 978-3-518-58758-4).
- Lehrbuch der Soziologie, (editor, with Steffen Mau; Campus, Frankfurt am Main 2020, ISBN 978-3-593-50346-2).
- Otto Hintze. Werk und Wirkung in den historischen Sozialwissenschaften (editor, with Wolfgang Neugebauer; Vittorio Klostermann, Frankfurt am Main 2024)
- Universalismus. Weltherrschaft und Menschheitsethos (Suhrkamp, Berlin 2025, ISBN 978-3-518-58827-7).
