= Hermann Jäger =

German botanist

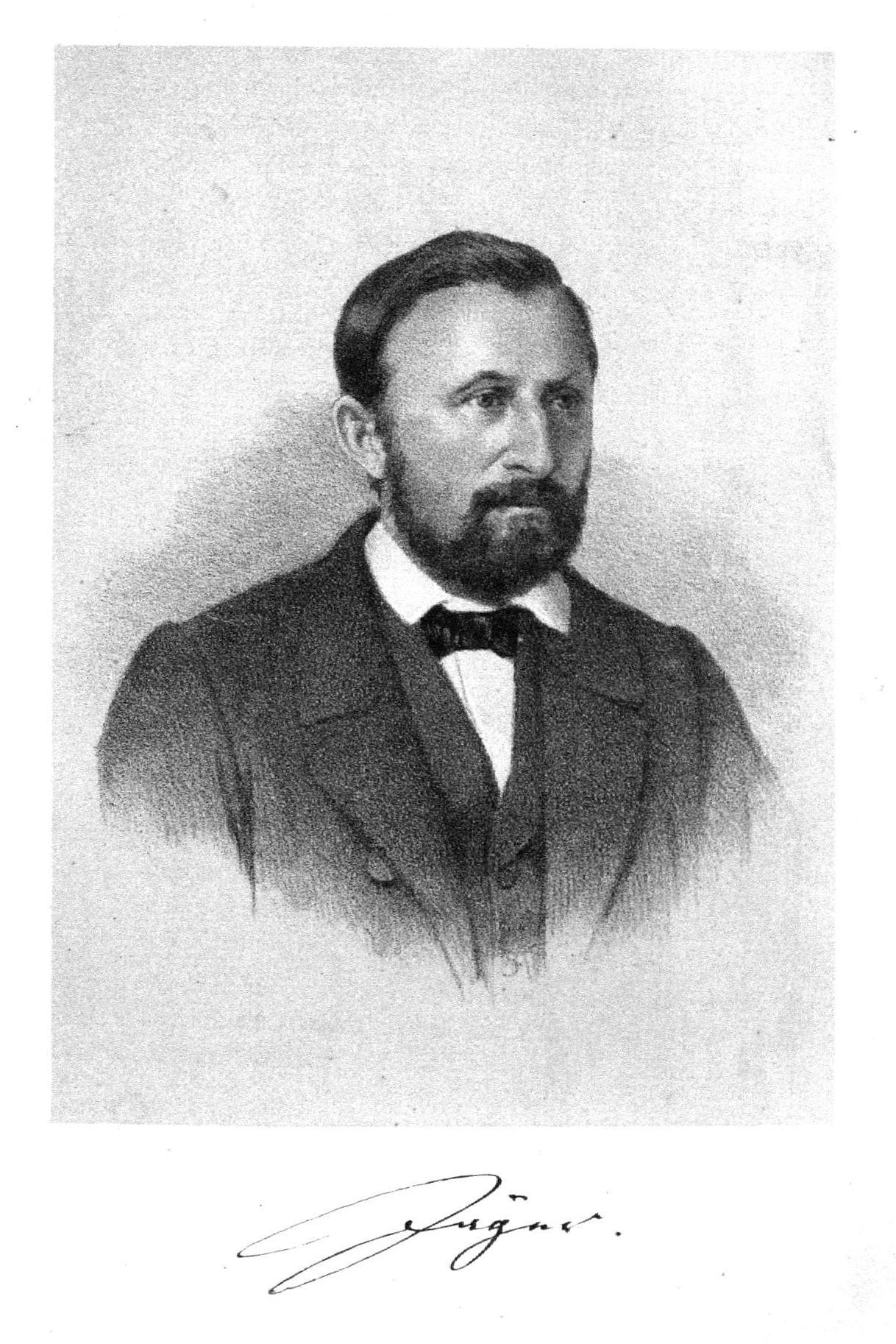
Hermann Jäger portrait

Hermann Jäger (7 October 1815 – 5 January 1890) was born at Münchenbernsdorf, Saxony (now Germany). A botanist specializing in medicinal plants and horticulture, he was Associate Editor of the journal Gartenflora, founded in 1852 by Eduard von Regel, from 1857 until his death.

== Career ==
Jäger trained in horticulture at the Belvedere gardens in Weimar. He travelled to Italy in 1840, then studied at the Jardin du Luxembourg in Paris, where he specialized in pomology. After visiting Belgium and England, Jäger returned to the Belvedere, then worked for a short time at the botanical garden in Berlin. In 1844, he was engaged as a gardener at the Botanical Garden in Erlangen, where in 1873 he was appointed Director by the Grand Duke of Saxe-Weimar-Eisenach.

== Death ==
Jäger died aged 74 at Eisenach on 5 January 1890.

== Legacy ==
Jäger created many parks, but spent most of his time writing books on horticulture. His Lehrbuch der Gartenkunst (:Textbook of Garden Art) published in 1877 enjoyed much success.

== Publications ==
- Jäger, H. & Beissner. (1884) Ziergeholze der Garten und Parkanlagen: Alphabetische geordnete beschreibung, Kultur und Verwendung Aller bis jetzt naher bekannten Holzpflanzen und ihrer Abarten, Welche in Deutschland und Landern von gleichem Klima im freien gezogen werden konnen ... ein handbuch fur Gartner, Baumschulen- und Gartenbesitzer, Forstmanner, etc. Edition 2. Abbreviation: Ziergehloze Gart. Park., ed. 2. B. F. Voigt, Weimar.
- Jäger, H. (1890) Der Apothekergarten: Anleitung zur Kultur und Behandlung der in Deutschland zu siehenden medicinischen. Cohen, Hannover.
- Jäger, H. Gartenkunst und Gärten sonst und jetzt : Handbuch für Gärtner, Architekten und Liebhaber, Berlin : Parey, 1888.
- Jäger, H. 1882. Katechismus der Rosenzucht. Vollständige Anleitung über Zucht, Behandlung und Verwendung der Rosen im Lande und in Töpfen Leipzig: Weber
- Jäger, H. 1877. Katechismus der Ziergärtnerei oder Belehrung über Anlage, Ausschmückung und Unterhaltung der Gärten Leipzig: Weber

Jäger was also responsible for overseeing the following:

- Illustrirte Bibliothek des landwirthschaftlichen Gartenbaues für Gärtner, Landwirthe und Gartenbesitzer. Mit besonderer Berücksichtigung des Obst- und Gemüsebaues sowie des Gartenbetriebes in Frankreich und England. Erste Abth.: Der Praktische Obstgärtner in drei Bänden:
  - Vol. 1: Die Baumschule. Vollständige Anleitung zur Anzucht der Obstbäume zum Betriebe der Baumschulen im Grossen und Kleinen und zur Gewinnung neuer Obstsorten aus Samen., 2 éd., Leipzig, Otto Spamer, 1860, 239 pp.
  - Vol. 2: Der Obstbaumschnitt
  - Vol. 3: Der Obstbau, Leipzig, Otto Spamer, 1860
