= Kai Brodersen =

German historian and classicist (born 1958)

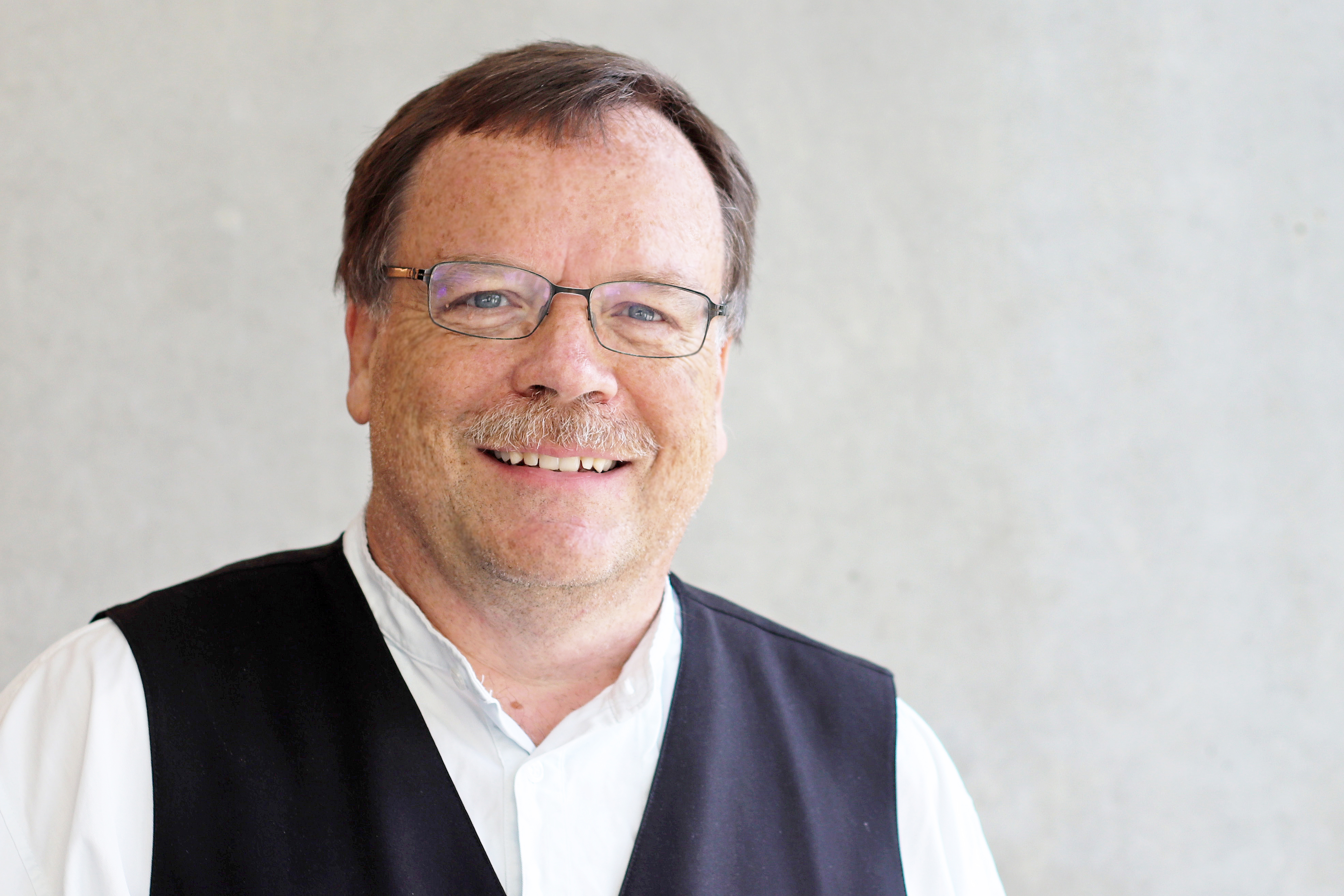
- Kai Brodersen in 2019
- Born: 6 June 1958 (age 68); Tübingen, Baden-Württemberg
- Education: LMU Munich
- Scientific career
- Fields: History
- Workplaces: University of Erfurt

Kai Brodersen (born 6 June 1958) is a contemporary ancient historian and classicist on the faculty of the University of Erfurt. He has edited, and translated, both ancient works and modern classical studies. His research focuses on "Applied Sciences" in antiquity, geography, historiography, rhetoric and ancient jokes, mythography and paradoxography, Septuagint studies and Aristeas, inscriptions and curse tablets, early Greek and Hellenistic history, Roman provinces (including Britannia), women and men in the Ancient World, turning points of Ancient History, history of classical scholarship and reception, often with twist (including Asterix) - plus a book for children.

== Biography ==
Kai Brodersen read Ancient History, Classics and (Protestant) Theology, funded by the "Stiftung Maximilianeum" and the Studienstiftung, at the University of Erlangen-Nuremberg, LMU Munich (Germany), and the University of Oxford. From LMU Munich, he holds a Dr. phil. (1986) and a Dr. phil. habil. (1995). He is married and has 4 grown-up children.

In 1996/7, he was made Chair of Ancient History at the University of Mannheim, which he then served for more than 10 years in leading positions (Dean, Dean of Studies and Dean of Finance, 6 years as Vice-President). In 2008, he was appointed Professor of Ancient Culture (Classics) at the University of Erfurt which he served as its president from 2008 to 2014, and continues to serve as a professor.

He has been a visiting fellow at Newcastle University (2000/01), University of St Andrews (2001/02), Royal Holloway, University of London (2006/7), St John's College, Oxford (2007/8), Lucian Blaga University of Sibiu (2014–2020), the University of Western Australia (2015) and the Wissenschaftkolleg Greifswald (2019-). He is a full member of the Saxonian Academy of Sciences and Humanities, and managing editor of the international journal of ancient History Historia.
