= Willy Brandt School of Public Policy =

Public policy school of the University of Erfurt

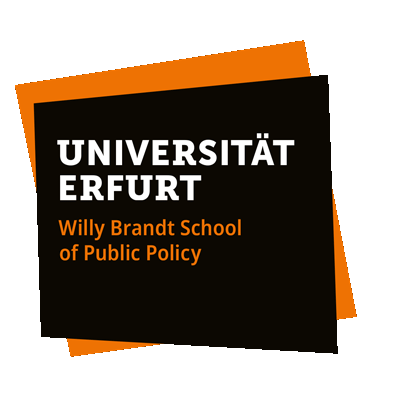
- Motto: See the world from a different perspective.
- Type: Public (University of Erfurt)
- Established: 2002
- Parent institution: University of Erfurt
- Academic affiliations: TPC
- Dean: Andreas Goldthau (Director), Achim Kemmerling (Deputy Director), Heike Grimm (Deputy Director)
- Students: 100-150
- Location: Erfurt, Germany
- Campus: Nordhäuser Straße
- Website: www.brandtschool.de

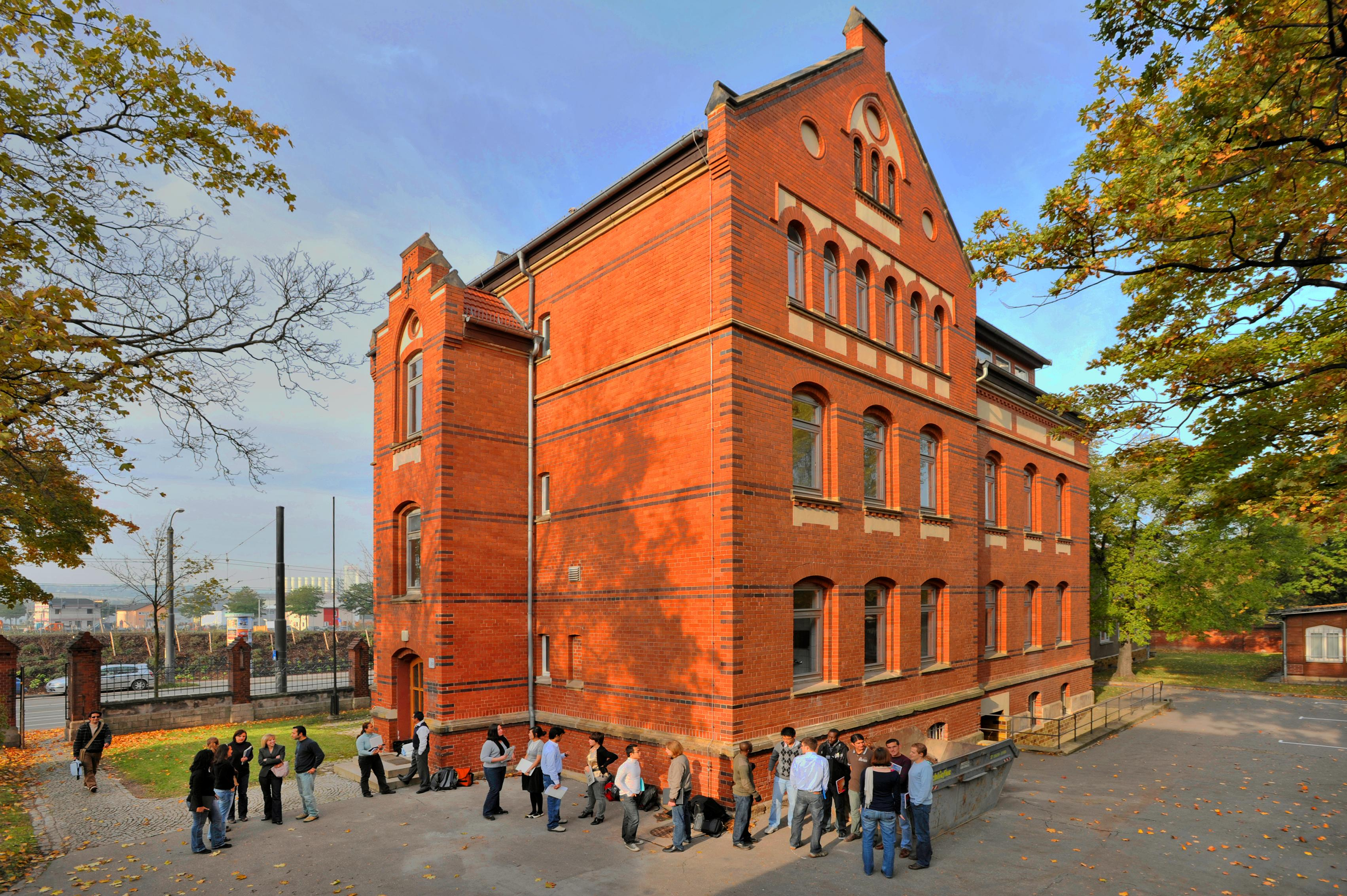
The Brandt School building until 2022

The Willy Brandt School of Public Policy is a public institute for research and education in the field of public policy at the University of Erfurt in Erfurt, in the German state of Thuringia. It was established in 2002, offering the first German study program leading to a Master of Public Policy (MPP) degree. The program has been accredited and re-accredited by ACQUIN and, in recent re-accreditations, by the internal accreditation commission of the University of Erfurt. The working language is English. Until November 2009, the school was named Erfurt School of Public Policy (ESPP).

== Concept ==
The Brandt School was designed according to the Anglo-American model of a professional school, where teaching, research, and transfer are organized jointly. In the area of public policy, the school offers advanced training at the master's level, combining knowledge and methods from different branches of the social sciences (economics, political science, public administration, management science, and sociology). Understanding itself as transdisciplinary, research and teaching at the Brandt School shall be oriented towards professional praxis and relevant social problems. Thus, research applies interdisciplinary approaches and methods to real-life problems. The Brandt School is particularly characterized by the internationality of its student body and faculty, with a community from more than 100 countries.

== Name ==
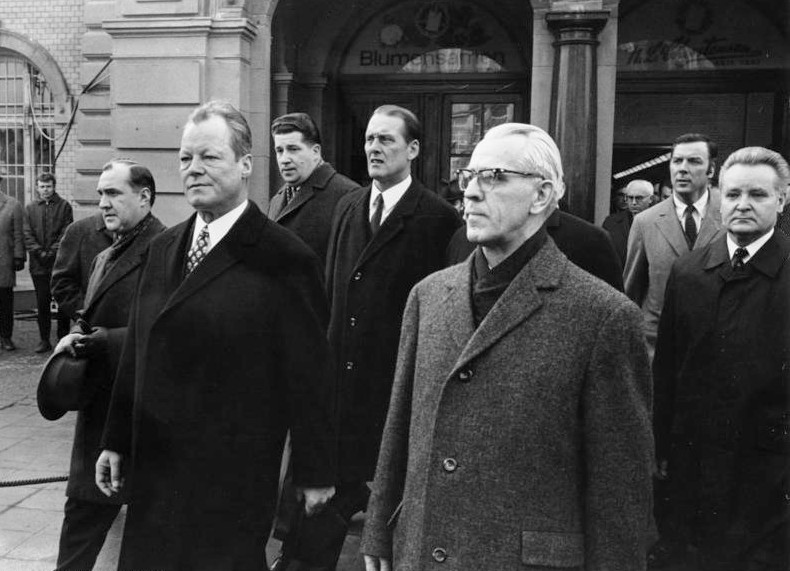
Brandt with Willi Stoph on March 19th 1970 in Erfurt

Willy Brandt was chosen as the name giver for various reasons that connect to the city of Erfurt, his style of making politics, and the focus of his politics. In 1970, Brandt visited Erfurt for the first German-German summit meeting and was enthusiastically cheered on by the local crowd. His contributions to the east–west and north–south dialogues have helped improve mutual understanding, and his modern, reform-oriented style serves as a role model for the students.

== Academic program ==
The Master of Public Policy (MPP) is an interdisciplinary, practice-orientated, two-year full-time program, conducted entirely in English. The program is intended for students from Germany and abroad, pursuing a future career dealing professionally with problems of modern governance in an executive, leading position. Possible areas of work are the public sector, international organizations, NGOs, politics and commercial enterprises. Since the MPP is a professional degree, applicants need to have prior work experience in a relevant field.

Drawn from political science, economics, sociology, public administration, and law, the MPP curriculum aims to equip students with tools and methods of policy analysis, development and implementation. Internships, capstones, professional skills and practical training courses, and case studies add practical aspects to the program. Furthermore, students can choose to specialize in two of the following areas:

- Global Policy
- Sustainable and Inclusive Development
- Peace and Conflict
- Social Entrepreneurship and Innovation Management
- Digital Policy and Artificial Intelligence

== Research ==
In addition to the study program, the school is also engaged in research on public policy and governance. There are five research clusters available:

- Global Public Policy (Energy Policy and Geopolitics)
- Development and Socio-Economic Policies
- Peace and Conflict
- Entrepreneurship and Public Policy
- Digital Policy and Artificial Intelligence

PhD students can join the postgraduate center "Effective and Innovative Policymaking in Contested Contexts" (EIPCC). The doctoral program De-Globalisation and Global Decoupling (DeGlobE) researches how the emerging recalibration of market and state, economic paradigms, and regulatory levels and approaches manifest under conditions of de-globalization. It is funded by the German foundation Hans-Böckler-Stiftung.

== Partnerships ==
The Willy Brandt School is long-term institutional partner of both the Franz Haniel Foundation and the German Academic Exchange Service (DAAD).

The German Academic Exchange Service (DAAD) supports and sponsors different scholarships and programs, most notably the Helmut Schmidt Scholarship (previously Public Policy and Good Governance program). Between 2008 and 2011, the Brandt School was furthermore the exclusive host for the Good Governance in Afghanistan program in cooperation with the German Foreign Office and the DAAD. It was especially designed for young Afghans and aimed at equipping them for the challenges they face in rebuilding the Afghan political system. 36 participants graduated between 2011 and 2013.

The Haniel Foundation sponsors the Franz Haniel Chair of Public Policy, the Aletta Haniel Chair for Public Policy and Entrepreneurship, as well as the Gerhard Haniel Professorship für Public Policy and International Development. It provides several scholarships for Brandt School students from Eastern Europe/CIS and from Western Europe/North America, respectively. It supported the Haniel Spring Schools which took place in Russia and have covered topics such as "Public Administration - Russia in Comparative Perspectives," "Border Policies from the Soviet Union to the EU," and "The Effects of Center-Local Relationships of Public Policy."

Various project partners support practice-oriented teaching at the Willy Brandt School, including the Melton Foundation, the Thuringian State Chancellery, and the Town & Country Stiftung. The school is a member of several networks and consortiums, including the European Consortium for Political Research, the International Public Policy Association, and the German-Colombian Peace Institute.

== Professors and Faculty ==
The professors and faculty members at the Willy Brandt School include, the Director and Franz Haniel Professor of Public Policy Andreas Goldthau, the Deputy Director and Aletta Haniel Professor of Public Policy and Entrepreneurship Heike Grimm, the Gerhard Haniel Professor of Public Policy and International Development Achim Kemmerling, Alejandra Ortiz-Ayala, Hasnain Bokhari, and several professors from the Faculty of Economics, Law and Social Sciences at the University of Erfurt. Frank Ettrich and Dietmar Herz, for example, had long-standing ties to the faculty, with the latter being the founder of the school and both of them having served as its directors.
