= University of Erfurt =

Public university in Thuringia, Germany

- Universität Erfurt
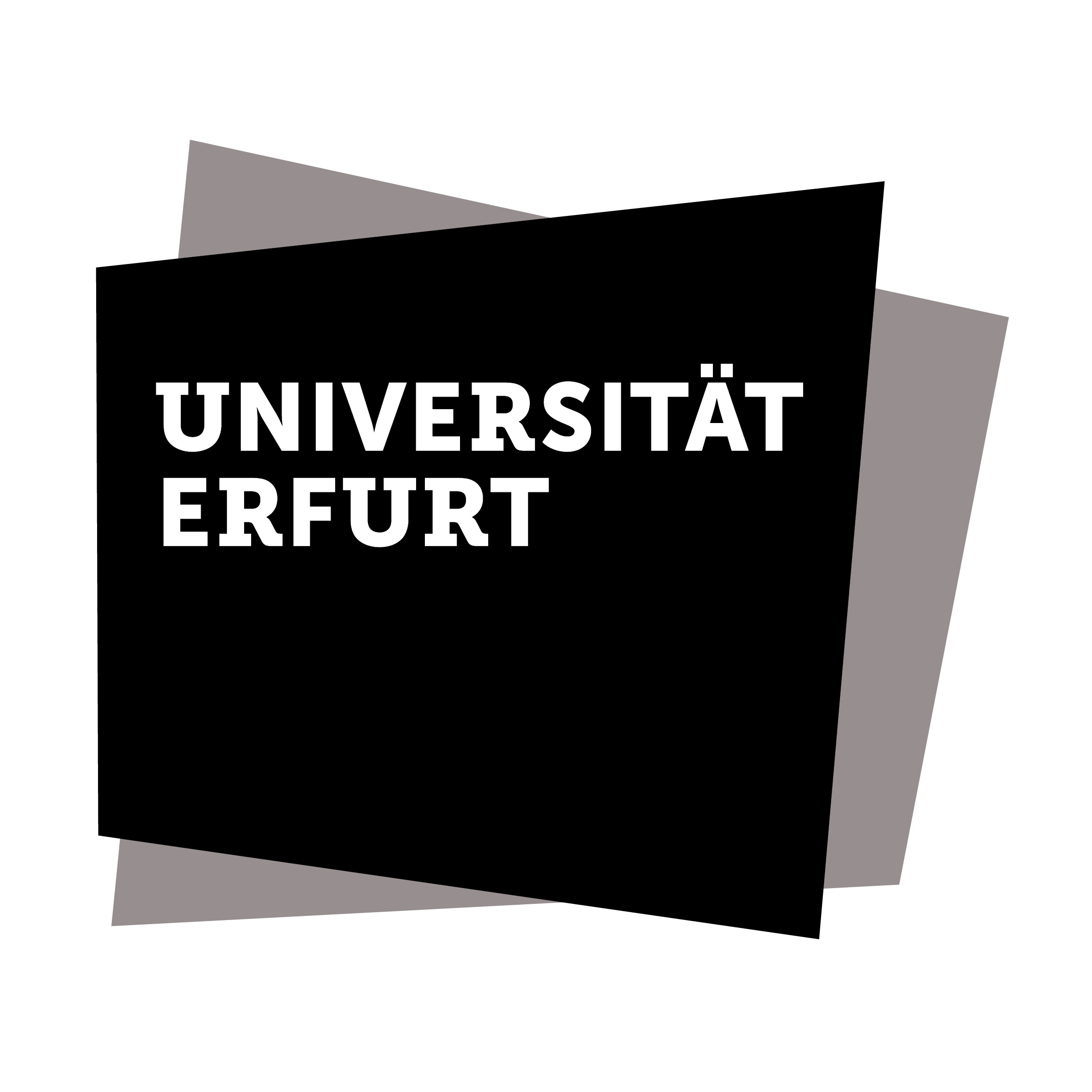
- Type: Public
- Established: 1379; 647 years ago (closed 1816–1993); reestablished 1994
- Academic affiliations: TPC
- Budget: € 59.5 million
- President: Walter Bauer-Wabnegg
- Academic staff: 358
- Administrative staff: 287
- Students: 5,715
- Location: Erfurt, Thuringia, Germany; 50°59′26″N 11°00′39″E
- Campus: Urban
- Website: www.uni-erfurt.de

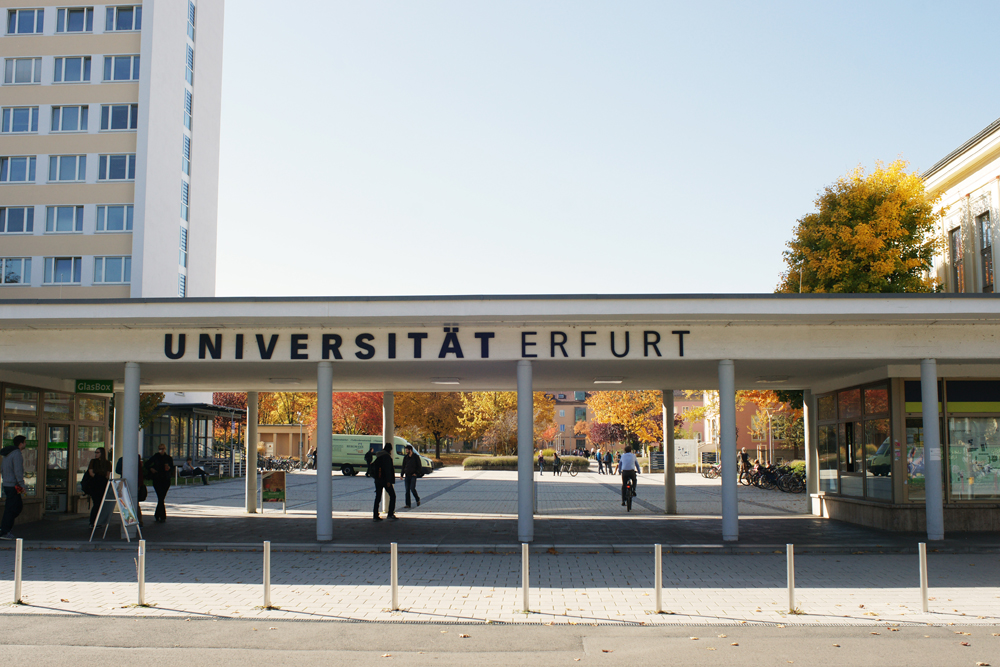
Entrance, University of Erfurt

The University of Erfurt (German: Universität Erfurt) is a public university located in Erfurt, the capital city of the German state of Thuringia. It was founded in 1379, and closed in 1816. It was re-established in 1994, three years after German reunification. Therefore, it claims to be both the oldest and youngest university in Germany. The institution identifies itself as a reform university, due to its most famous alumnus Martin Luther, the instigator of the Reformation, who studied there from 1501 to 1505. Today, the main foci centre on multidisciplinarity, internationality, and mentoring.

The university is home to the Max Weber Center for Advanced Cultural and Social Studies, the Gotha Research Center for Cultural and Social Scientific Studies, and the Willy Brandt School of Public Policy.

The Gotha Research Library, which has one of Germany's largest collections of early modern manuscripts, is part of the university. The University Library is also the keeper of the Bibliotheca Amploniana, a collection of nearly 1,000 medieval manuscripts collected by the scholar Amplonius Rating de Berka (c.1363–1435), who was a former rector of the university.

== History ==
=== 1379–1816 ===
The University of Erfurt was founded in 1379 in the Holy Roman Empire, in territory which is now modern-day Germany. When the town of Erfurt became part of Prussia in 1816, the government closed the university after more than 400 years of operation.

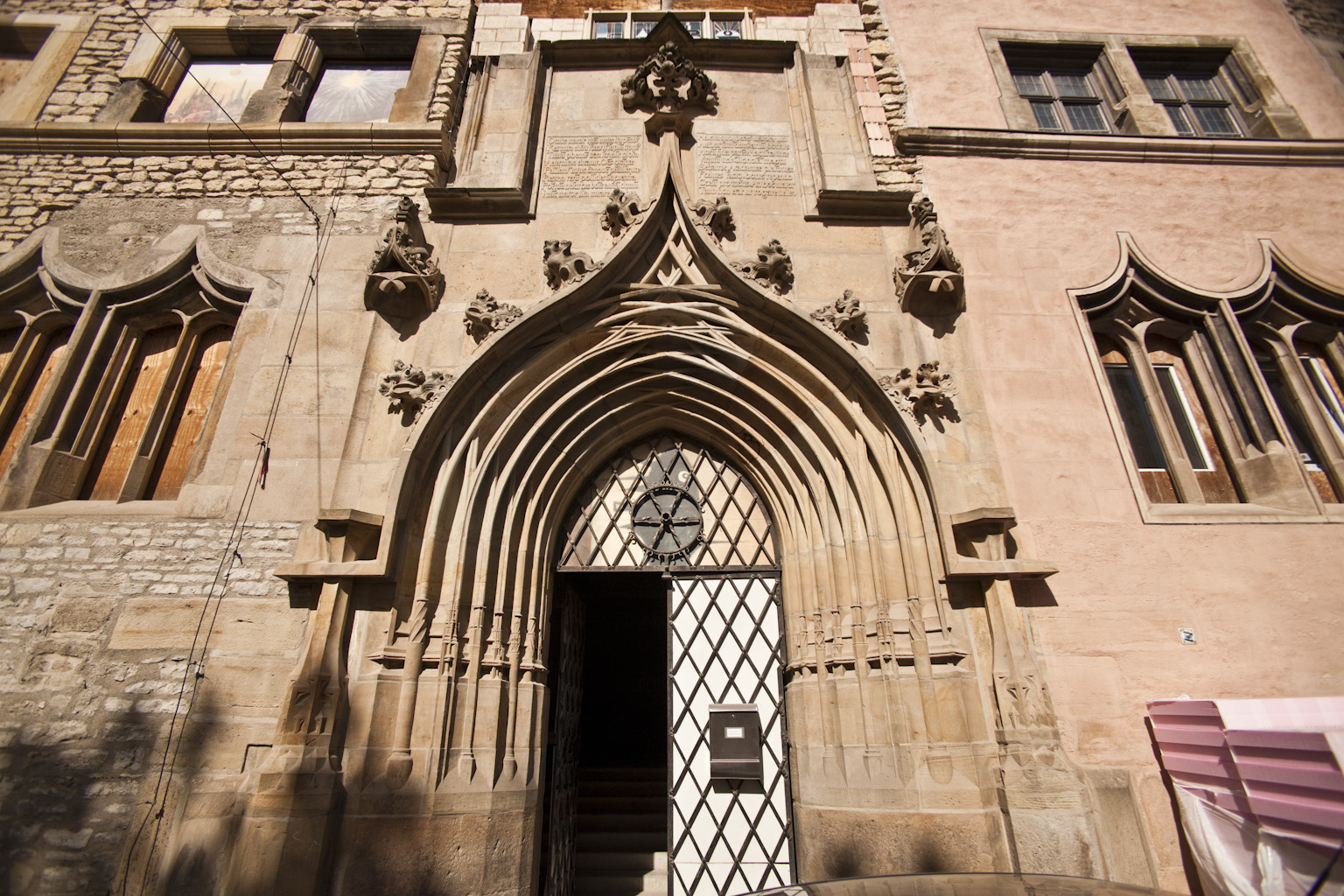
Collegium Maius

=== 1994–present ===
Erfurt was in the German Democratic Republic (East Germany) from 1949 to 1990. In December 1993, the State Government of Thuringia in reunified Germany, Landtag of Thuringia, voted to re-establish the university. The university was re-founded on 1 January 1994. Lectures began in the winter term of 1999/2000. Shortly afterwards, the rector who had overseen the founding, Peter Glotz, a politician in the Social Democratic Party, left the university. The position was taken over by Wolfgang Bergsdorf.

In 2001, the Erfurt Teachers' Training College (Pädagogische Hochschule Erfurt), founded in 1953, became part of the university. On 1 January 2003, a fourth faculty was added to the university: the Roman Catholic Theological Faculty, which had belonged to Erfurt's Philosophical and Theological Centre (Philosophisch-Theologisches Studium Erfurt).

The University of Erfurt is a liberal arts university with a reformed and socio-cultural profile. The close integration of the Philosophical, Educational Research, Governmental Studies, the Catholic Theological Faculty, and the Max Weber Center, promotes interdisciplinary alongside innovative approaches to research and teaching through a mentoring program.

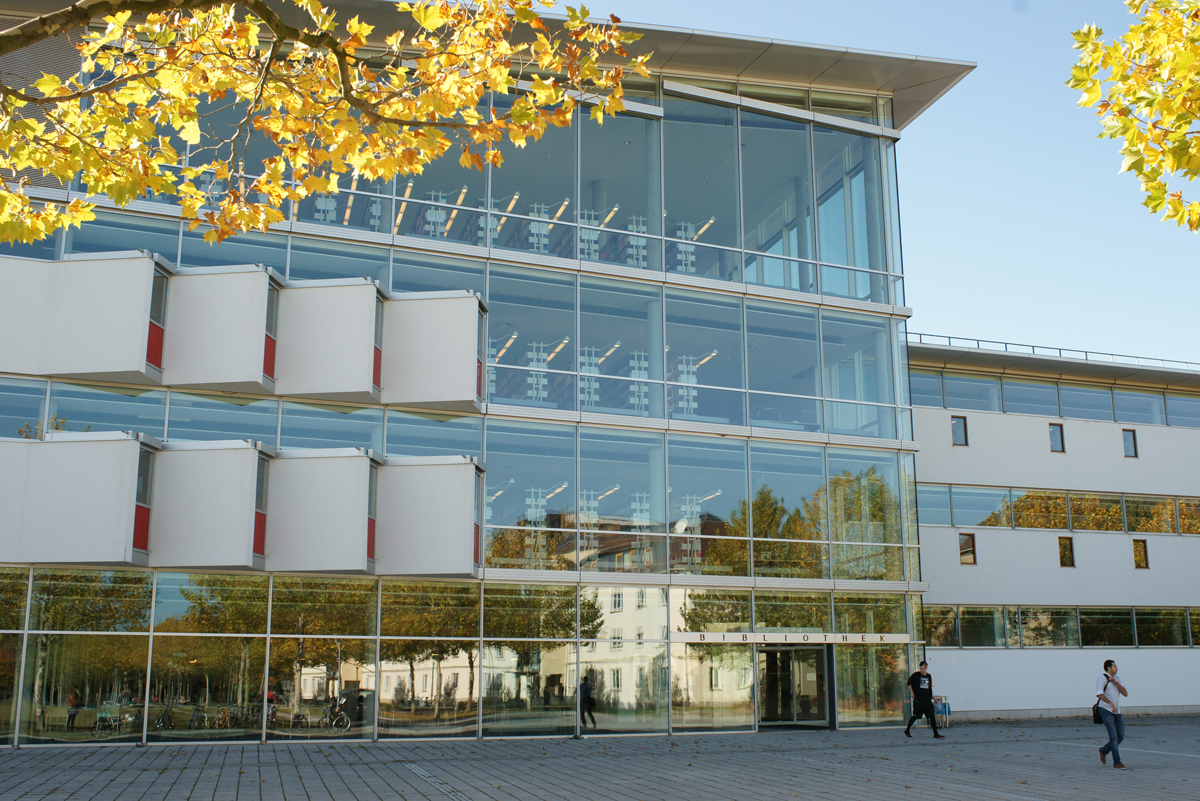
University of Erfurt's library

The University of Erfurt has no tuition fees and represents the first institution of higher education to receive the family-friendly certificate for employers.

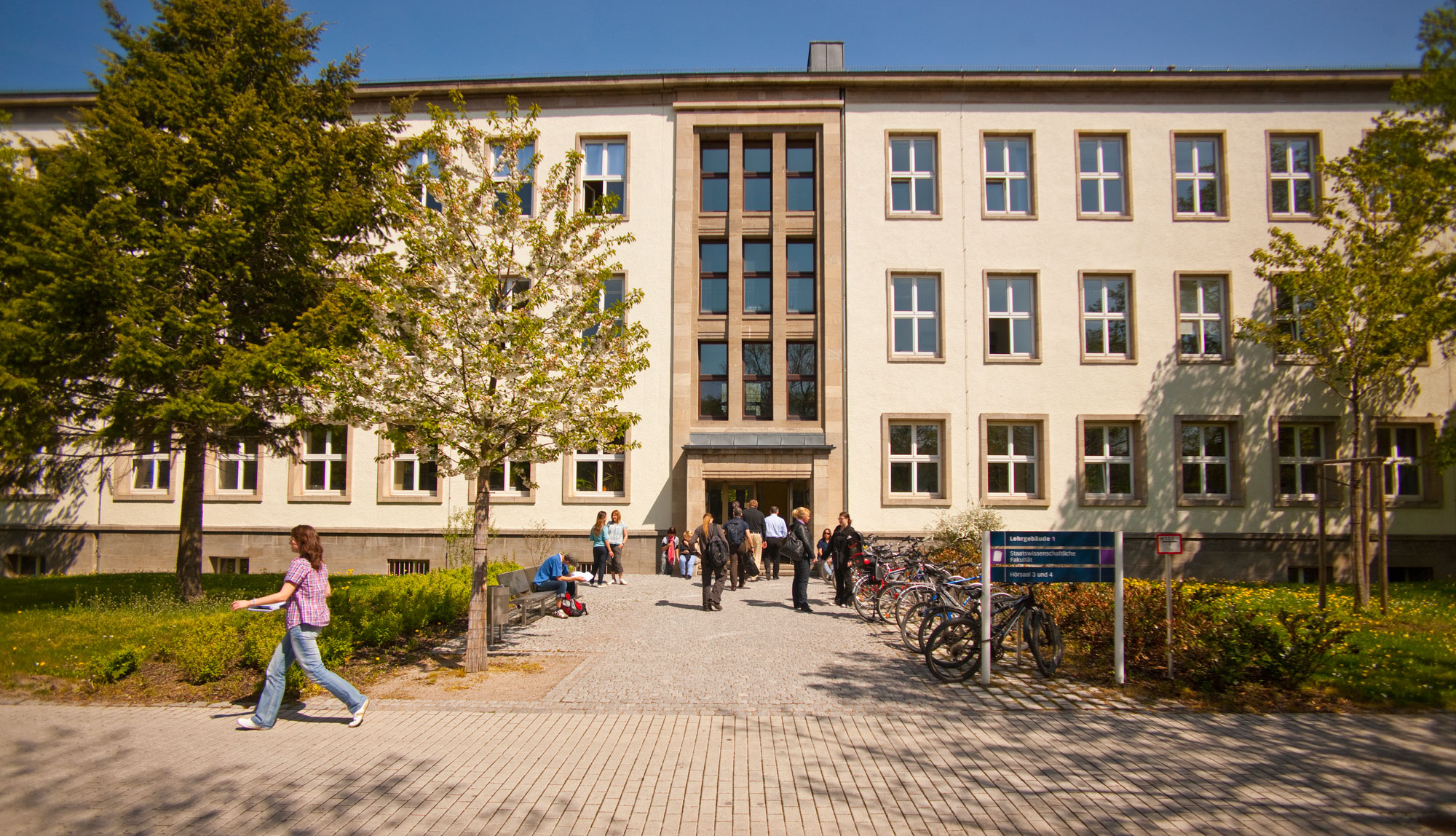
Faculty of Economics, Law and Social Sciences

== Faculties and institutions ==
The University of Erfurt has five faculties and three academic institutes:

- Faculty of Education
- Faculty of Catholic Theology
- Faculty of Philosophy
- Faculty of Governance (Law, Economics and Social Science), the only one in Germany
- Max Weber Center for Advanced Cultural and Social Studies

The academic institutes are:

- Erfurt School of Education
- Research Centre for Social and Cultural Studies in Gotha
- The Willy Brandt School of Public Policy, the former Erfurt School of Public Policy (ESPP), which is partly financed by tuition fees.

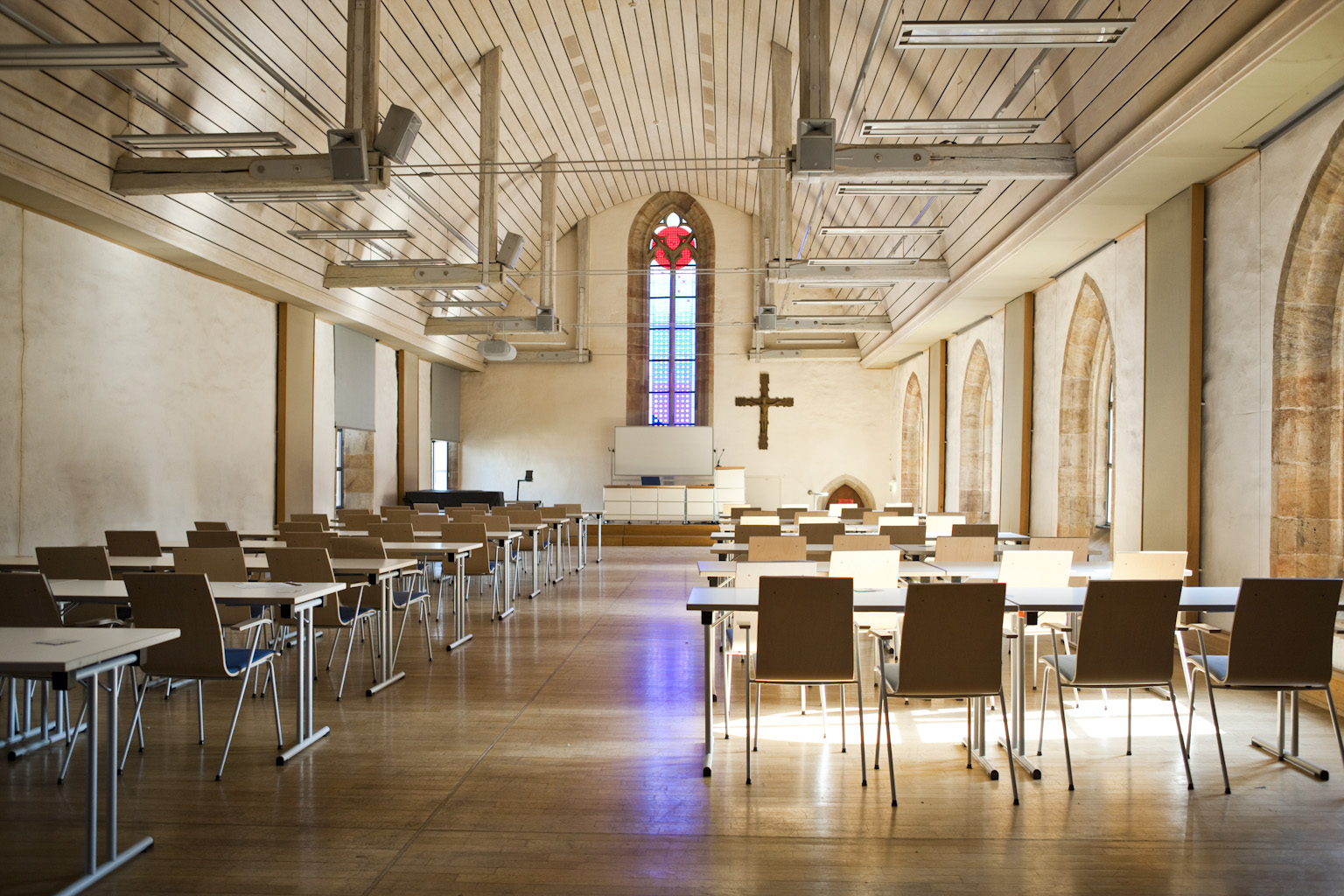
Faculty of Catholic Theology

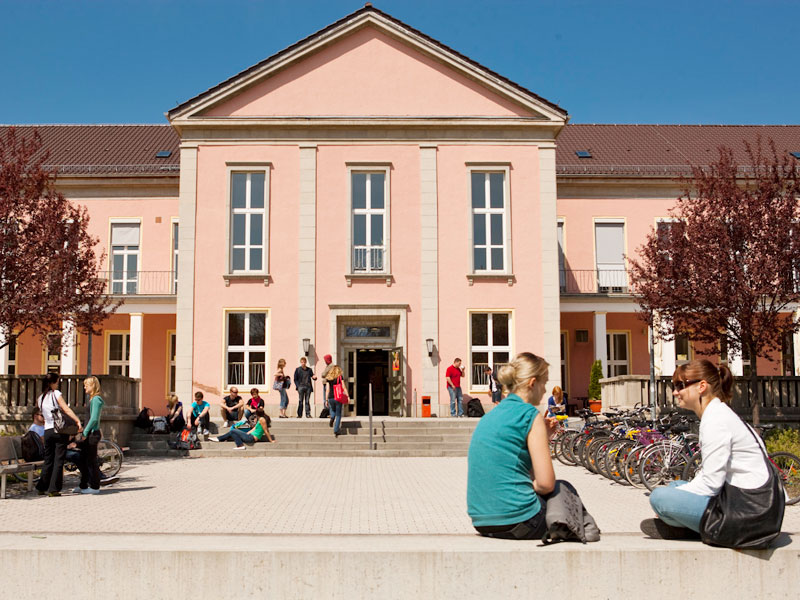
Registrar's Office ("Studium und Lehre" department)

== Academic programs and priorities ==
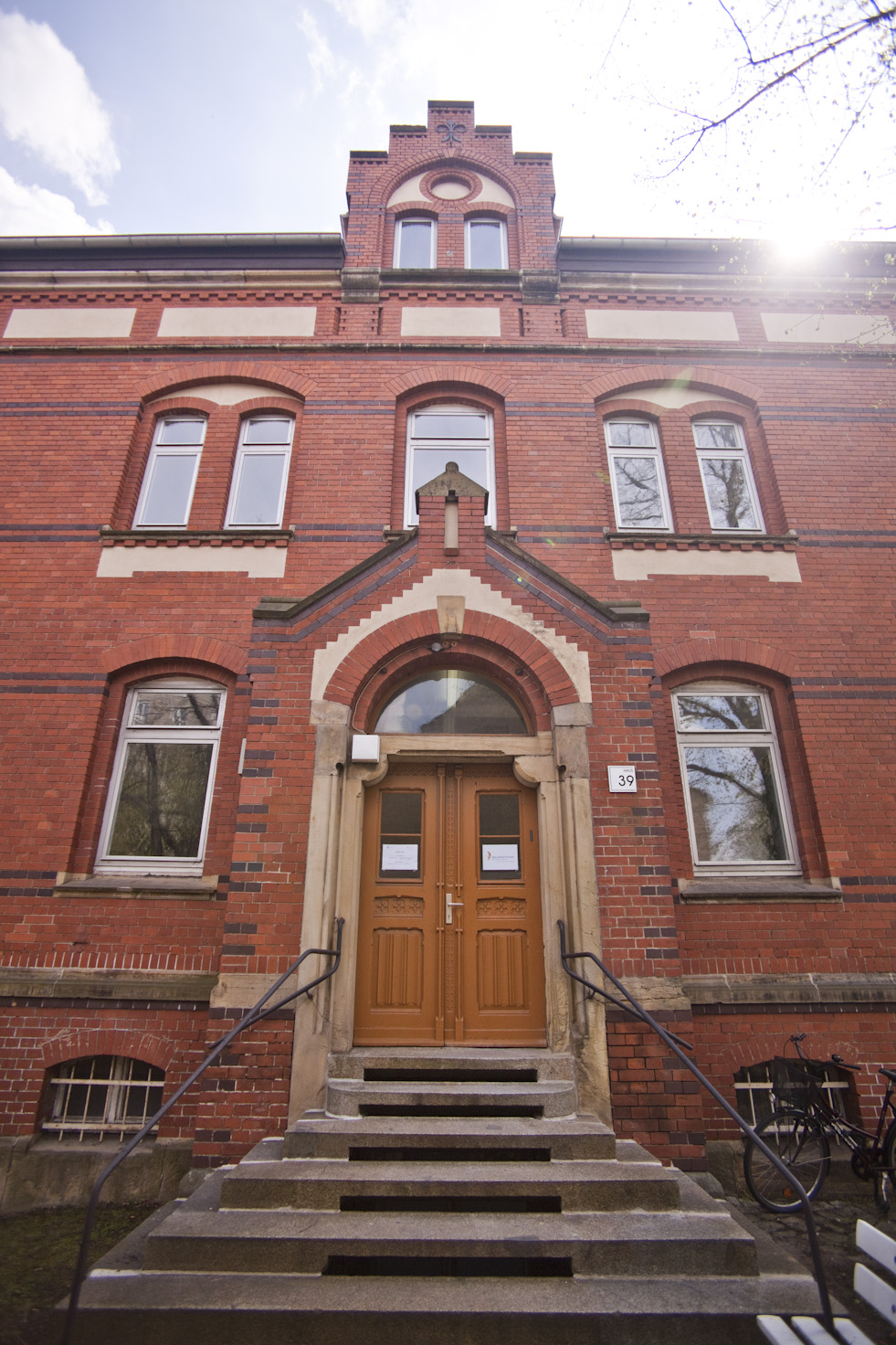
Willy Brandt School of Public Policy at the University of Erfurt

=== Academic priorities ===
- Religious studies
- Sociology
- Governance (Law and economics)
- Education

=== Regular summer schools ===
- International Summer Course for German Language, Literature and Culture
- Summer School, "Muslims in the West"
- Summer Program in Communications Erfurt (SPICE)
- International Spring School

== University research groups and projects ==
=== Current research groups ===
Currently following colleges and research teams are part of the Erfurt doctoral and postdoctoral program (EPPP):

- The research group Communication and Digital Media (COMDIGMED) is an interdisciplinary and international scale embedded and association of researchers. This project will combine to support the research activities of its members in the fields of communication science, educational science, psychology and social science, and networking of research and teaching help. COMDIGMED is the co-creator of university education focus.
- In the Center for Empirical Research in Economics and Behavior (Cereb) scientists work together on economic and behavioral sciences, focusing on the theoretical modeling of human decision behavior, the design of social institutions and educational and career choices as long-term Selbststeuerungsprozesse. The university is involved in this specialization.
- The Graduate School "Religion in modernization processes" engages religion-related research projects from the religious, social, literary, media, and history of science, theology and philosophy. It engages young scientists with the problems in this area, and offers attractive conditions for their work to develop new understandings of religion in modernization processes.
- The research program of Max Weber Center is directed to the problems of religion, science and law as interpretation and control powers, interactions between cultures, social systems and mentalities in radical change, and action bases of cultural and social sciences and their relation to normative, especially ethical issues.
- The DFG-Graduiertenkolleg "Human Dignity and Human Rights" employs young researchers at the Max Weber Center and the University of Jena with creation, development and application of a central value of modernity: human dignity, including consideration of a reduced history of violence.
- The projects of the Research "Proficiency" deal with the theory-based coverage and promotion of linguistic competence. These are all language modalities (reading, listening, writing, speaking), both at the primary are taken as well in second language acquisition in the eye. The research group is actively involved in the design of the gravity profile the Education of the University of Erfurt.
- The Research Training Group of the Forum "Texte.Zeichen.Medien." her profile is not covered by the thematic orientation, but by the transphilologische and interdisciplinary nature of their access to their objects – texts, symbols and media.
- The DFG Research Training Group "Media historiographies" deals with the mutual relationship between history and media. The question of a "history of the media 'with the question of" media history "intertwined: how different media to determine the encoding of historical situations and processes, and how media and media techniques bring out their own particular history.
- The platform regions of the world & interactions

=== University projects ===
In the summer semester of 2003, a project group was formed at the university to take part in the National Model United Nations (NMUN) in New York City in April 2004. The pilot project has become a regular, student-organized seminar at the university. The various groups received several awards for their participation at the conference in 2006, 2007, and 2008.

In 2018, the university's Gotha Research Centre launched FactGrid as a joint venture with Wikimedia Germany and the German National Library. FactGrid is a Wikibase database intended to help historians collaborate in international projects.

== People ==
=== Original foundation (1392–1816) ===
- Martin Luther, theologian
- Ulrich von Hutten, Lutheran supporter
- Johannes Gutenberg, printer (attendance debated)
- Christoph Martin Wieland, poet
- Konrad of Megenberg, historian
- Johannes de Indagine, Carthusian monk and theologian
- Johann Hieronymus Kniphof, physician and botanist

=== Re-establishment (since 1996) ===
==== Presidents ====
- Peter Glotz, politician and social scientist (1996–1999)
- Wolfgang Bergsdorf, political scientist(2000–2007)
- Kai Brodersen, ancient historian (2008–2014)
- Walter Bauer-Wabnegg, narratologist (2014–)

==== Faculty ====
- Cornelia Betsch, psychologist
- Beate Hampe, linguist
- Martin Mulsow, historian
- Susanne Rau, historian
- Jörg Rüpke, classicist and historian of religions
- Gila Schauer, linguist

==== Alumni ====
- Andreas Bausewein, politician

== See also ==
- List of medieval universities
- List of universities in Germany
- Education in Germany
