= Semantic publishing =

Publishing on the Semantic Web

Semantic publishing on the Web, or semantic web publishing, refers to publishing information on the web as documents accompanied by semantic markup. Semantic publication provides a way for computers to understand the structure and even the meaning of the published information, making information search and data integration more efficient.

Although semantic publishing is not specific to the Web, it has been driven by the rising of the semantic web. In the semantic web, published information is accompanied by metadata describing the information, providing a "semantic" context.

Although semantic publishing has the potential to change the face of web publishing, acceptance depends on the emergence of compelling applications. Web sites can already be built with all contents in both HTML format and semantic format. RSS1.0, uses RDF (a semantic web standard) format, although it has become less popular than RSS2.0 and Atom.

Semantic publishing has the potential to revolutionize scientific publishing. Tim Berners-Lee predicted in 2001 that the semantic web "will likely profoundly change the very nature of how scientific knowledge is produced and shared, in ways that we can now barely imagine". Revisiting the semantic web in 2006, he and his colleagues believed the semantic web "could bring about a revolution in how, for example, scientific content is managed throughout its life cycle". Researchers could directly self-publish their experiment data in "semantic" format on the web. Semantic search engines could then make these data widely available. The W3C interest group in healthcare and life sciences is exploring this idea.

== Two approaches ==
- Publish information as data objects using semantic web languages like RDF and OWL. Ontology is usually developed for a specific information domain, which can formally represent the data in its domain. Semantic publishing of more general information like product information, news, and job openings uses so-called shallow ontology. The SWEO Linking Open Data Project maintains a list of data sources that follow this approach as well as a list of Semantic Publishing Tools.
- Express structured data in markup languages with RDFa, embed or publish information using JSON-LD, Turtle, TriG syntaxes.

== Examples ==
Examples of ontologies and vocabularies for publishing
- Dublin Core
- FOAF
- DOAP
- SKOS
- SIOC
- SPE
- RSS

Examples "semantic content" containers for publishing
- Journal Article Tag Suite (JATS)

== Examples of free or open source tools and services ==
- Ambra Project is open source software designed to publish open access journals with RDF. Used by PLoS.
- Semantic MediaWiki: An extension to the wiki application MediaWiki that allows users to semantically annotate data on the wiki, and then publish it in formats such as RDF XML.
- D2R Server: Tool for publishing relational databases on the Semantic Web as Linked Data and SPARQL endpoints.
- Utopia Documents Interactive documents
- dokieli is a client-side editor for decentralized article publishing in HTML+RDFa (and embeddable TriG, Turtle, JSON-LD), annotations and social interactions. It implements W3C specifications: Web Annotation, Linked Data Notifications, Activity Streams 2.0, ActivityPub. Employs WebID+TLS and WebID+OIDC for authentication, Web access control list and compliant with Linked Data Platform. Articles and annotations can be individually assigned with a Creative Commons license as well as a language. Its source code uses the Apache License, Version 2.0.

== See also ==
- JSON-LD
- Metadata
- Metadata publishing
- Open Semantic Framework
- Semantic technology
- RDF feed
- Data feed
