= Apache Stanbol =

Software

- Developer: Apache Software Foundation
- Written in: Java
- License: Apache License 2.0
- Website: stanbol.apache.org
- Repository: svn.apache.org/repos/asf/stanbol/trunk/

Apache Stanbol was an open source modular software stack and reusable set of components for semantic content management. Apache Stanbol components are meant to be accessed over RESTful interfaces to provide semantic services for content management. Thus, one application is to extend traditional content management systems with (internal or external) semantic services.

Additionally, Apache Stanbol lets you create new types of content management systems with semantics at their core. The current code is written in Java and based on the OSGi component framework. Applications include extending existing content management systems with (internal or external) semantic services, and creating new types of content management systems with semantics at their core.

== History ==
In 2008, the Salzburg Research led, as entity coordinator, a consortium of seven research partners and six industrial partners to the proposal of the IKS project with the aim of receiving funding by the European institutions under the 7th Framework Programme.

The consortium comprised

- Salzburg Research (Coordinator), Austria
- DFKI - Forschungsinstitut für Künstliche Intelligenz, Germany
- Hochschule St. Gallen, Switzerland
- CNR-ISTC - Consiglio Nazionale delle Ricerche, Italy
- Software Quality Lab, University of Paderborn, Germany
- SRDC - Software Research and Development and Consultancy Ltd., Turkey
- Hochschule Furtwangen, Germany
- Nuxeo, France
- Alkacon Software GmbH, Germany
- TXT Polymedia, Italy
- Pisano Holding GmbH, Germany
- Nemein Oy, Finland
- Day Software AG, Switzerland

In January 2009, the Interactive Knowledge Stack (IKS) started partly funded by the European Commission to provide an "open source technology platform for semantically enhanced content management systems". IKS received €6.58m co-funding by the European Union for an overall project duration of 4 years, hence setting the project's end date by the end of 2012.

Apache Stanbol was founded in November 2010 by members the EU research project Interactive Knowledge Stack (IKS). It was the result of an ongoing discussion about how to ensure that the results, especially the developed software, of the IKS project would be available to vendors of content management systems (CMS) after the project’s official funding period ended in 2012. The members of the IKS project decided to initiate the Apache Stanbol project as part of the incubation program of the Apache Software Foundation (ASF).

One of the first code imports of Apache Stanbol was the so-called "Furtwangen IKS Semantic Engine" (FISE) which eventually became the Apache Stanbol Enhancer with its Enhancement Engines. Other contributions of code were the KReS (Knowledge Representation and Reasoning) and the RICK (Reference Infrastructure for Content and Knowledge) components. Later on followed the Contenthub, while KReS was split into the Apache Stanbol Ontology Manager and Reasoner components, and the RICK is today known as the Apache Stanbol Entityhub. From that moment Apache Stanbol was developed as an open source software project independent of the IKS research project.

On 15 November 2010 Apache Stanbol enters incubation.

On 9 May 2012 version 0.9.0-incubating is released.

On 10 July 2012 version 0.10.0-incubating is released.

By the middle of 2012 Apache Stanbol had demonstrated that it has an active community and is able to produce software and releases according to the ASF standards. The board of directors of the ASF accepted the formal resolution to establish Apache Stanbol as a top-level project on 2012-09-19.

On 5 March 2013 Salzburg Research announced that 8 entities, among those Sebastian Schaffert (head of the knowledge and media technologies group), Rupert Westenthaler (Stanbol initial committer and PMC) and Sergio Fernández (Stanbol committer) set up an effort to deliver Apache Stanbol and Apache Marmotta services under the Redlink brand.

On 15 April 2020 the Stanbol Project was officially terminated. The move to the Apache Attic was completed in April 2021.

== Main features ==
Apache Stanbol's main features are:

=== Content Enhancement ===
Services that add semantic information to “non-semantic” pieces of content. The Apache Stanbol Enhancer provides both a RESTful and a Java API that allows a caller to extract features from passed content. In more detail the passed content is processed by Enhancement Engines as defined by the called Enhancement Chain.

- Using the Stanbol Enhancer
  - RESTful
  - Java API
  - Main Interfaces and Utility Classes
  - Enhancement Structure
- List of Available Enhancement Engines

=== Reasoning ===
Services that are able to retrieve additional semantic information about the content based on the semantic information retrieved via content enhancement. The Stanbol Reasoners component provides a set of services that take advantage of automatic inference engines.

The module implements a common api for reasoning services, providing the possibility to plug different reasoners and configurations in parallel.

Actually the module includes OWLApi and Jena based abstract services, with concrete implementations for Jena RDFS, OWL, OWLMini and HermiT reasoning service.

=== Knowledge Models ===
Services that are used to define and manipulate the data models (e.g. ontologies) that are used to store the semantic information. The Apache Stanbol Ontology Manager provides a controlled environment for managing ontologies, ontology networks and user sessions for semantic data modeled after them. It provides full access to ontologies stored into the Stanbol persistence layer. Managing an ontology network means that you can activate or deactivate parts of a complex model from time to time, so that your data can be viewed and classified under different "logical lenses". This is especially useful in Reasoning operations.

=== Persistence ===
Services that store (or cache) semantic information, i.e. enhanced content, entities, facts, and make it searchable. The Apache Stanbol Contenthub is an Apache Solr based document repository which enables storage of text-based documents and customizable semantic search facilities. The Contenthub exposes an efficient Java API together with the corresponding RESTful services.

== Bibliography ==
- Bachmann-Gmur, Reto (July 26, 2013). Instant Apache Stanbol (1st ed.). Packt Publishing. ISBN 978-1783281237.
- Gurevych, Iryna; Kim, Jungi, eds. (2013). The People's Web Meets NLP. Theory and Applications of Natural Language Processing (1st ed.). Springer. ISBN 978-3-642-35085-6.
- Hassnaa, Moustafa; Sherali, Zeadally, eds. (May 14, 2012). Media Networks: Architectures, Applications, and Standards. CRC Press. ISBN 978-1439877289.
- Maass, Wolfgang; Kowatsch, Tobias, eds. (2012). Semantic Technologies in Content Management Systems. Springer. ISBN 978-3-642-24960-0.
- Endres-Niggemeyer, Brigitte, ed. (2013). Semantic Mashups. Springer. p. 131. ISBN 978-3-642-36403-7.
- Aroyo, L.; Welty, C.; Alani, H.; et al., eds. (2011). The Semantic Web -- ISWC 2011. Information Systems and Applications, incl. Internet/Web, and HCI. Springer. p. 191. ISBN 978-3-642-25093-4.
- Criado-Fernández, Luis (10 June 2013). del Amor León-Fariña, María (ed.). Nosotros, los constructores de la Web Semántica (in Spanish). ASIN B00DC8IAJA.
- Snml-Tng Salzburg Newmedialab (May 14, 2013). Zukunft Von Linked Media: Trends, Entwicklungen Und Visionen (in German) (1st ed.). Salzburg Research Forschungsgesellschaft m.b.H. p. 9. ISBN 978-3902448361.
- Behrendt, Wernher; Damjanovic, Violeta, eds. (March 2013). Developing Semantic CMS Applications - The IKS Handbook (PDF) (1st ed.). Salzburg Research Forschungsgesellschaft m.b.H. ISBN 978-3-902448-35-4. Archived from the original (PDF) on 2014-03-27.
