= WAULT =

Measurement used in commercial real estate

WAULT, short for weighted average unexpired lease term, is a measurement used in commercial real estate to quickly judge the value of contracted rents in a property, or more commonly, a portfolio of properties. It is one of the many key performance indicators (KPIs) used in the field.

A WAULT is the product of currently contracted rental income between now and the time the leases expire for any given tenant, summed across tenants, and then divided by the total annual income of the property or portfolio being studied. The result is expressed in years. A closely related measure is the WAULT to break, which sums the individual rents to their first break, the point where the tenants can legally leave their lease. The basic definition is also known as WAULT to expiry to make the distinction clear.

Depending on the market conditions, one might desire a high or low WAULT. For instance, if the rental market is strong and rents are rising, a low WAULT is desirable as that indicates that the current leases are going to expire or renegotiate in the short term and rental incomes are likely to rise. Conversely, in soft markets a long WAULT indicates steady income through lean periods.

A WAULT-like value can also be expressed using leased areas instead of rents. Depending on the property type this may be a better indication of the market, as some leases like anchor tenants and kiosks might skew the results on a purely rent basis. This measure is sometimes known as a WALE, for weighted average lease expiry, although this terminology is not as common as WAULT.
