= LDN =

LDN may refer to:

== Arts and media ==
- "LDN" (song), a 2006 single by Lily Allen
- London Daily News, former newspaper
- BBC London (formerly BBC LDN), broadcasting body

== Language ==
- Láadan, a feminist, sci-fi conlang (ISO 639-3:ldn)

== Medicine ==
- Low-dose naltrexone, to treat immune diseases
- Licensed dietitian nutritionist, a qualified dietician

== Places ==
- Lamidanda Airport, Nepal (IATA code)
- Lanao del Norte, province in Northern Mindanao, Philippines
- London, in British contractional slang
- Llandanwg railway station, north Wales (GBR:LDN)

== Science and technology ==
- Day-night average sound level (Ldn)
- Linked Data Notifications, a communications protocol
- Lynds' Catalogue of Dark Nebulae, in astronomy
