= Farm income =

Farm income is a statistical indicator of the income from farming for a particular country per year or some other period. This statistic is used by governments to determine agricultural policy and performance of the agricultural sector by financial markets.

In United States there are several different gauges of farm income that are used for agricultural policy. These include:

- Gross cash income is the sum of all receipts from the sale of crops, livestock, and farm related goods and services as well as all forms of direct payments from the government.
- Gross farm income is the same as gross cash income with the addition of nonmoney income, such as the value of home consumption of self-produced food and the imputed gross rental value of farm dwellings.
- Net cash income is gross cash income less all cash expenses such as for feed, seed, fertilizer, property taxes, interest on debt, wages to hired labor, contract labor and rent to nonoperator landlords.
- Net farm income is gross farm income less cash expenses and noncash expenses, such as capital consumption, perquisites to hired labor, and farm household expenses. It is a longer term measure of the ability of the farm to survive as a viable income-earning business.
- Net cash income is a shorter term measure of cash flow.

== Farm income and balance sheet ==
The income statement measures the profitability of a farm business for a particular period of time, usually one year. The balance sheet measures the wealth or financial position of the business at a particular point in time by reporting the farm’s assets, debt, and net worth.

In the United States the Economic Research Service publishes the income statement and balance sheet of the Nation’s farm sector, and the farm sector financial statement for each state.

== See also ==
- Off-farm income
