= Off-farm income =

Off-farm (non-farm) income refers to the portion of farm household income obtained off the farm, including nonfarm wages and salaries, pensions, and interest income earned by farm families. On average for all farms in the United States, off-farm income accounts for over 90% of farm operator household income.

== See also ==
- Farm income
- Gross farm income
