= Phillip C.-Y. Sheu =

Taiwanese American Professor

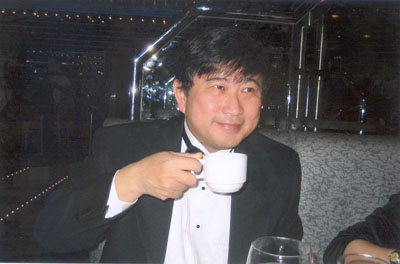
- Occupation: Professor

Academic background
- Education: Ph.D., University of California, Berkeley, Electrical Engineering and Computer Science (1986); M.S., University of California, Berkeley, Computer Science; B.S. National Taiwan University, Electrical Engineering
- Alma mater: University of California, Berkeley; National Taiwan University

Academic work
- Discipline: Electrical engineering and computer science
- Sub-discipline: Semantic computing, robotic computing, artificial intelligence
- Institutions: University of California, Irvine (UCI), Samueli School of Engineering

Chen-Yu (Phillip) Sheu is a professor with joint appointments in electrical engineering, computer science and biomedical engineering at the University of California, Irvine. He has contributed to semantic computing, robotics computing, artificial intelligence, biomedical computing, and multimedia computing.

He was co-editor of Semantic Computing (IEEE Press/Wiley).

== Biography ==
Sheu, an American citizen originally from Taiwan has a B.S. in electrical engineering from National Taiwan University and an M.S. in Computer from UC Berkeley. In 1986, he completed his doctoral thesis Logic-oriented Object Bases under the guidance of C.V. Ramamoorthy.

Sheu's current research is about semantic computing and Generative Problem Solving (GPS), an extension of semantic computing that bridges modern artificial intelligence and classic artificial intelligence. Currently, he is a professor at the University of California, Irvine.

He is known for starting the field of semantic computing in 2007; semantics addresses all the resources including data, documents, tools, devices, processes, and people. Moreover, the scope of Semantic Computing includes analytics, semantics description language, Semantic integration, Semantic interface and its applications. The latest development of ChatGPT demonstrates the importance of semantic computing.

He founded the Institute of Electrical and Electronics Engineers (IEEE) Computer Society Technical Committee on Semantic Computing (TCSEM) and the Institute for Semantic Computing Foundation. He has the vision behind the IEEE International Conferences of Semantic Computing (ICSC) Robotic Computing and Communication, and AIx Artificial Intelligence series.

Sheu is the founding editor-in-chief of the International Journal of Semantic Computing(IJSC) and the Encyclopedia of Semantic Computing and Robotic Intelligence (ESCRI). These platforms have contributed to disseminating knowledge and advancements in the respective fields. At Advanced Micro Devices Inc. (AMD), he worked as a product planning engineer.

Sheu received an IEEE fellow award in 2003. He is the inaugural educator-in-chief of the IEEE AI Academy.

== Selected publications ==
=== Books ===
- Sheu, Phillip; Yu, Heather; Ramamoorthy, C. V.; Joshi, Arvind K.; Zadeh, Lotfi A. (2010-07-08). Semantic Computing. Wiley. ISBN 978-0-470-58821-5.
- Sheu, Phillip C.-Y.; Xue, Qing (1993). Intelligent Robotic Planning Systems. World Scientific. ISBN 978-981-02-0759-5.
- Sheu, Phillip C.-Y. (2012-12-06). Software Engineering and Environment: An Object-Oriented Perspective. Springer Science & Business Media. ISBN 978-1-4615-5907-8.

=== Journals ===
- Li, Haosong; Sheu, Phillip C.-Y. (2022-03-28). "A scalable association rule learning and recommendation algorithm for large-scale microarray datasets". Journal of Big Data. 9 (1): 35. doi:10.1186/s40537-022-00577-4. ISSN 2196-1115.
- Li, Haosong; Sheu, Phillip C.-Y. (2021-06-09). "A scalable association rule learning heuristic for large datasets". Journal of Big Data. 8 (1): 86. doi:10.1186/s40537-021-00473-3. ISSN 2196-1115.
- Wang, Charles C. N.; Jin, Jennifer; Chang, Jan-Gowth; Hayakawa, Masahiro; Kitazawa, Atsushi; Tsai, Jeffrey J. P.; Sheu, Phillip C.-Y. (2020-09-03). "Identification of most influential co-occurring gene suites for gastrointestinal cancer using biomedical literature mining and graph-based influence maximization". BMC Medical Informatics and Decision Making. 20 (1): 208. doi:10.1186/s12911-020-01227-6. ISSN 1472-6947. PMC 7469322. PMID 32883271.
- Chou, Chung-Hsien; Sheu, Phillip; Hayakawa, Masahiro; Kitazawa, Atsushi (2020-08-01). "Querying large graphs in biomedicine with colored graphs and decomposition". Journal of Biomedical Informatics. 108 103503. doi:10.1016/j.jbi.2020.103503. ISSN 1532-0464. PMID 32682828.
- Lin, Hsuan-Jen; Sheu, Phillip C.-Y.; Tsai, Jeffrey J. P.; Wang, Charles C. N.; Chou, Che-Yi (2020-05-24). "Text mining in a literature review of urothelial cancer using topic model". BMC Cancer. 20 (1): 462. doi:10.1186/s12885-020-06931-0. ISSN 1471-2407. PMC 7245902. PMID 32448176.
- Wang, Charles C. N.; Li, Chia Ying; Cai, Jia-Hua; Sheu, Phillip C.-Y.; Tsai, Jeffrey J. P.; Wu, Meng-Yu; Li, Chia-Jung; Hou, Ming-Feng (2019). "Identification of Prognostic Candidate Genes in Breast Cancer by Integrated Bioinformatic Analysis". Journal of Clinical Medicine. 8 (8): 1160. doi:10.3390/jcm8081160. ISSN 2077-0383. PMC 6723760. PMID 31382519.
- Wang, Shaoting; Zhang, Guigang; Sheu, Phillip; Hayakawa, Masahiro; Shigematsu, Hiroyuki; Kitazawa, Atsushi (2018). "Lossy Graph Data Reduction". International Journal of Semantic Computing. 12 (3): 425–456. doi:10.1142/S1793351X18500022. ISSN 1793-351X.
- Wang, Charles C. N.; Sheu, Phillip C.-Y.; Tsai, Jeffrey J. P. (2015). "Towards Semantic Biomedical Problem Solving". International Journal of Semantic Computing. 09 (4): 415–431. doi:10.1142/S1793351X15500075. ISSN 1793-351X.
