= Metric power =

Metric power is a sociological concept developed by David Beer. It involves the prominent use of metrics as a form of "power, governance, and control." Metric power is used in a range of areas, and can have both positive and negative connotations.

== Concept of metric power ==
Beer's concept is based on three main inter-related ideas which are the focus of metric power: measurement, circulation, and possibility. Essentially, a measurement of lifestyle data is taken, which is then put into circulation allowing for a range of possibilities to be made for the individual. This creates a cycle of metric power. To have metric power is to both enable and constrain the possibilities of individuals. These possibilities can be situated in a range of areas, including "our behaviour, our cultural and social practices, and our material reality."

=== Measurement ===
The measurement of metrics is not new within society. Measuring different aspects of society, and the individuals within society, allows for numbers to be generated in relation to these different aspects. To measure society allows for certain areas to be given more attention over others. Likewise, the measurement of social life determines what is important and needs our attention. Beer makes particular note of the relation between measurement and neoliberalism. Specifically, competition as an essential aspect of neoliberalism. Drawing from French philosopher Michel Foucault, Beer states that "neoliberalism requires and pursues forms of marketised competition - competition, of course, requires measurement." As such, the connection between neoliberalism and measurement stems from governance needing measurements of society in order to effectively govern and have control. Furthermore, in order for competition to be realised, measurements of metrics must be taken. Beer also points out that measurements, and the creation of competition, are sometimes even taken for fun: "we see that people even measure themselves for fun and allow themselves to compete with other users." Thus, the measurement of metrics are used both as a form of power and simply out of curiosity.

=== Circulation ===
The circulation of measurements throughout the world and within different areas allow for metrics to become "more visible and powerful than others." Beer identifies two types of circulation of measurements: the 'social life of methods' and the 'social life of data.' The 'social life of data,' Beer states, is "based on the circulation of metrics themselves," while the 'social life of methods' is "based upon the circulation of the methods that produce that data." Simply put, the measurement of metrics circulate throughout society is different ways and this circulation allows for the further production of metric data.

The circulation of measurements are also related to algorithms. On the relationship between circulation of metrics and algorithms, Beer states that "there is no doubt that in trying to understand the way that metrics circulate, we would need to understand the part played by algorithms in filtering, searching, retrieving, promoting, and prioritising those metrics." This is especially important with the growing and evolving technology of today, where society is unable to control the circulation of data.

=== Possibility ===
The possibilities that are generated from the circulating measurements are the final, and most important, idea of Beer's concept and what also gives the collection of metric data power. Additionally, the possibilities created by the measurement and circulation of metric data further creates new norms or solidifies existing ones, as well as creating categories for measurements. The creation of such, as explained by Saori Shibata, allows for "some things to be more visible than others, and for others still to be hidden, leading to an increase in the importance of certain phenomena whilst others are rendered marginal." Therefore, the created possibilities can not only have the ability to influence, but also has the ability to inhibit.

== Examples and uses ==
Some of the most prominent and obvious examples of metric power is through the use of smart devices. Beer makes particular note of Apple's Apple Watch. Stating that the use of metrics within the device is actually a marketing technique of the developers. On their website, Apple states that data collected from their devices in conjunction with specific apps (for example, health apps) is used to "promote healthier habits."

Workplaces have also been known to take advantage of metric power in forms of "surveillance, electronic performance monitoring, personal analytics, wearable self- and other-tracking and monitoring." Beer understands call-centres as a prime example of workplace metric power. In this type of workplace, employees are monitored in many ways ranging from being listened to during phone calls, computer use being tracked, and even when employees would be on a break. Beer states that this type of metric power is an observation of employee effort, noting that when an employee knows they are being watched or listened to, it specifically promotes compliance within the workplace. Therefore, within workplaces, the measurement of employee effort is circulated within different channels in order to provide possibilities, or produce compliance, for the employees.

== Public sentiment ==
Metric data measurement is often used within society in a positive way.
