= GPS (disambiguation) =

GPS is the Global Positioning System, an American satellite-based radio navigation service.

GPS or gps may also refer to:

== Technology ==
- Satellite navigation, GPS in common parlance
  - GPS navigation device, especially an automotive navigation system
- Generalized processor sharing, an algorithm to fairly share computer processing time
- General Problem Solver, a 1959 computer program
- Generative Problem Solving, field of artificial intelligence

== Organizations ==
- Crossroads GPS (Grassroots Policy Strategies), a nonprofit corporation that works in conjunction with the Super PAC American Crossroads
- Fusion GPS, American commercial and strategic research firm
- Ghana Prisons Service
- GPS (band), a progressive rock band
- GPS Rugby, an Australian rugby union club
- Geirus Policies and Standards committee, a body of the Rabbinical Council of America
- Gabungan Parti Sarawak, a Malaysian political coalition based in Sarawak

=== Education ===
- Greenwich Public Schools, a school district in Greenwich, Connecticut, United States
- Gilbert Public Schools, a school district in Gilbert, Arizona, United States
- Greenville Public Schools, a school district in Greenville, Mississippi, United States
- Girls Preparatory School, an all-girls prep school in Chattanooga, Tennessee, United States
- Grosse Pointe South High School, a public high school in Grosse Pointe, Michigan, United States
- The School of Global Policy and Strategy, an institute of international studies at the University of California, San Diego, United States
- Great Public Schools, several associations of boys' private schools in Australia
  - Athletic Association of the Great Public Schools of New South Wales
  - Great Public Schools Association of Queensland

=== Medicine ===
- Goodpasture syndrome, a rare autoimmune disease
- Gray platelet syndrome, a rare congenital autosomal recessive bleeding disorder

== Other uses ==
- Fareed Zakaria GPS (Global Public Square), a CNN television show
- Geometrical Products Specification, an international standard for geometric dimensioning and tolerancing
- Genealogical Proof Standard
- "GPS" (song), a song by Maluma
- "Var är jag", renamed to "GPS", a song by Basshunter from his LOL <(^^,)> album
- Seymour Airport, Galápagos Islands, Ecuador (IATA code: GPS)
