= Net farm income =

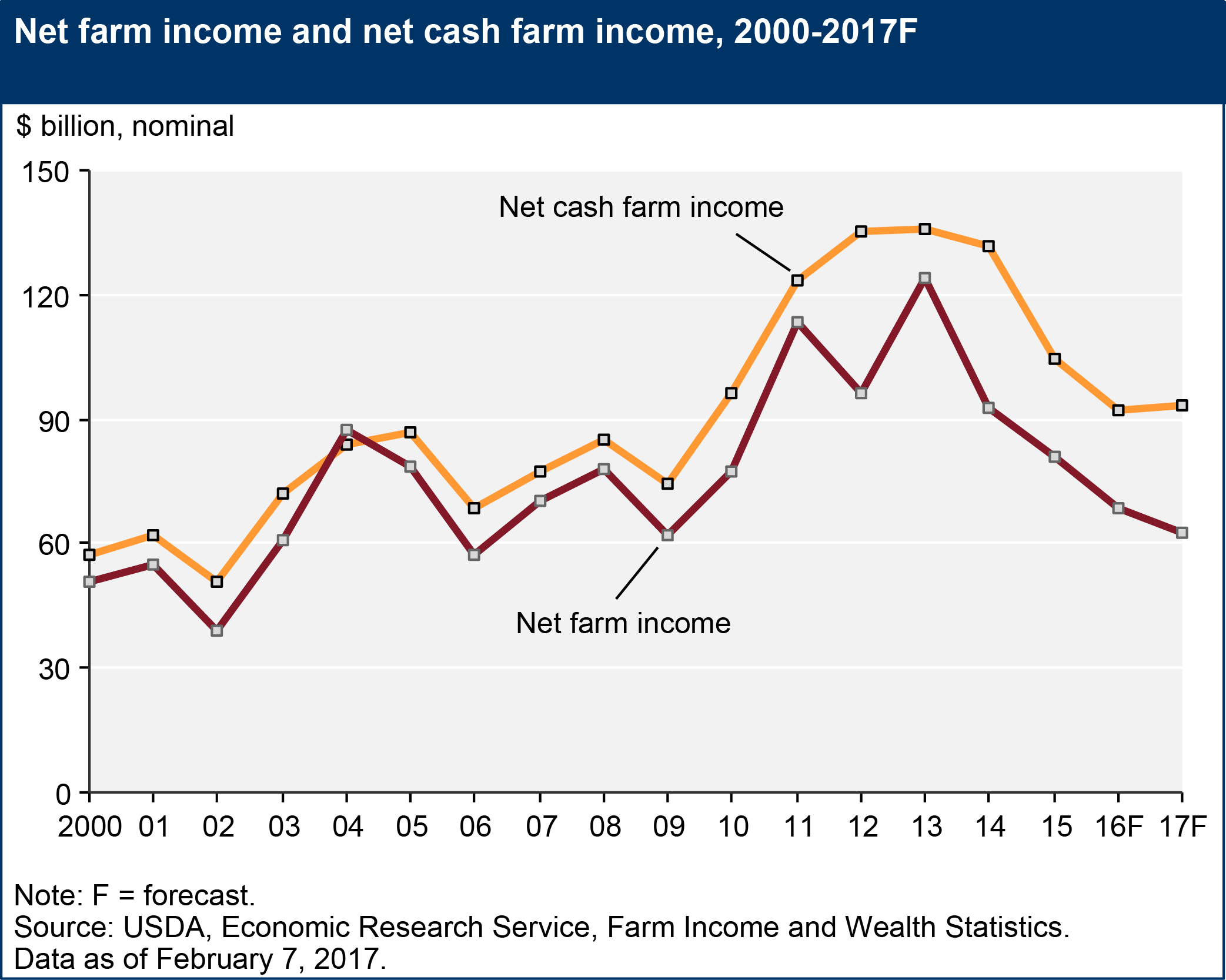
U.S. net farm income and net cash farm income, 2000—2017

In United States agricultural policy, net farm income refers to the return (both monetary and non-monetary) to farm operators for their labor, management and capital, after all production expenses have been paid (that is, gross farm income minus production expenses). It includes net income from farm production as well as net income attributed to the rental value of farm dwellings, the value of commodities consumed on the farm, depreciation, and inventory changes.

== See also ==
- Farm income
