= Tassilo Pellegrini =

Prof. (FH) Dr. Tassilo Pellegrini (born 1974) studied International Trade, Communication Science and Political Science at the University of Linz, University of Salzburg and University of Málaga. Since the end of 2007 he has been working as a lecturer at the University of Applied Sciences in St. Pölten. He obtained his master's degree in 1999 from the University of Salzburg on the topic of telecommunications policy in the European Union, which was followed by a PhD in 2010 on the topic of bounded policy-learning in the European Union with a focus on intellectual property policies. His current research encompasses economic effects of internet regulation with respect to market structure and outcome. He is a member of the International Network for Information Ethics (INIE), the African Network of Information Ethics (ANIE) and the Deutsche Gesellschaft für Publizistik und Kommunikationswissenschaft (DGPUK). Beside his specialisation in policy research and media economics Tassilo Pellegrini has worked on semantic technologies and the Semantic Web. He is a co-founder of the Semantic Web Company in Vienna, a co-editor of the first German textbook on Semantic Web and Conference Chair of the annual I-SEMANTICS conference series founded in 2005.

== Selected bibliography ==
- Krone, Jan; Pellegrini, Tassilo (2012). Netzneutralität und Netzbewirtschaftung. Baden-Baden: Nomos Verlag
- Krone, Jan; Pellegrini, Tassilo (2011). The commodification of internet data transfer and its impact on public-sector AV online services. Network neutrality and broadband content. In: Issues of Business and Law, 6/1, 2011
- Pellegrini, Tassilo (2011). Semantic Web in netzbasierten Unterhaltungsmedien. Bausteine für eine Metadaten-Ökonomik. In: Müller-Lietzkow, Jörg (Ed.). Ökonomie, Qualität und Management von Unterhaltungsmedien. Tagungsband der deutsche Gesellschaft für Publizistik und Kommunikationswissenschaft. Baden-Baden: Nomos Verlag
- Pellegrini, Tassilo; Auer, Sören; Tochtermann, Klaus; Schaffert, Sebastian (2009). Networked Knowledge – Networked Media. Integrating Knowledge Management, New Media Technology and Semantic Systems: New York: Springer Verlag
- Blumauer, Andreas; Pellegrini, Tassilo (2008). Social Semantic Web. Die Konvergenz von Social Software und Semantic Web Berlin: Springer Verlag
- Pellegrini, Tassilo; Blumauer, Andreas (2006): Semantic Web. Wege zur vernetzten Wissensgesellschaft. Berlin: Springer Verlag
