= Match performance indicator =

Match Performance Indicators (MPI) are the performance indicators of sport. The term was created by, and is widely used, in the scouting and analyzing system eye4TALENT.

MPIs are set up as an indicator of a football player's performance compared to a standard of a specific position on the field. When judging e.g. a football player's performance, it is then possible to compare his stats with the MPI of his playing position.

Since the introduction, the term has widely been used in various Danish media including Ekstra Bladet, BT, 6'eren and Kontra Magazine.
