= Gross farm income =

In United States agricultural policy, gross farm income refers to the monetary and non-monetary income received by farm operators. Its main components include cash receipts from the sale of farm products, government payments, other farm income (such as income from custom work), value of food and fuel produced and consumed on the same farm, rental value of farm dwellings, and change in value of year-end inventories of crops and livestock.

== See also ==
- Net farm income
- Farm income
