= Salzburg Research =

Research institute in Austria

Salzburg Research Forschungsgesellschaft mbH
- Type: Gesellschaft mit beschränkter Haftung
- Industry: Applied Research, Research and Development
- Founded: 2000
- Headquarters: Salzburg, Austria
- Key people: Managing director: Siegfried Reich
- Owner: State of Salzburg
- Number of employees: 75 (2025)
- Website: www.salzburgresearch.at

Salzburg Research Forschungsgesellschaft mbH is an independent research and technology organisation (RTO), located in Salzburg, Austria. The organisation specializes in applied research and development in the field of information and communications technologies (ICT).

== History ==
In 1996, the Telekom Research Center of Salzburg's University of Applied Sciences and the Institute for Information Economics and New Media merged into the Techno-Z Forschungs- und Entwicklungs GmbH. On January 19, 2000 the State of Salzburg became the sole owner of the research organisation, turning it into the "Salzburg Research Forschungsgesellschaft".

== Research departments and projects ==
- ANC - Advanced Networking Center: Reliable Internet and network technologies, data transmission security, Internet technologies for power grids, flexible communications solutions
- IoT - Internet of Things: Conceptual designs, architectures and implementation of software systems for IoT in industry "Industrial Internet"
- MOWI - Mobile and Web-based Information Technologies: Real-time localisation, interactive geo-web applications, location-based web and mobile services, spatio-temporal data analyses of motion data
- iLab - Innovation Lab: Identification and assessment of customer needs, innovation signals in online communities, business model analysis, systematic idea generation and selection (early stages of innovation), network innovation, scenario building, benchmarking, policy evaluation.

In addition to the core competencies of the individual research groups, Salzburg Research works in the following interdisciplinary research topics: e-Health, e-Tourism, e-Energy, and Industrial Internet.

Salzburg Research is involved in several international R&D projects funded by the EU Framework Programmes for Research and Technological Development and many national research projects - some examples:

- CONFIDENCE develops a community-based mobility safeguarding assistance service for people with mild to moderate dementia. Confidence combines "assistive technologies" with "personal help". The project was awarded the international AAL Awards (jury and public award) in 2014.
- IDIRA develops a system of technologies and guidelines for optimal resource planning and operations across national and organisational borders in case of disasters.
- Instandhaltung 4.0 (Maintenance 4.0): The exploratory project addresses the impact of R&D work currently described by the terms Industrial Internet or Industry 4.0, on maintenance and asset management.
- FCD Modellregion Salzburg: Model region for coverage of traffic conditions with the Floating Car Data (FCD) approach. The live volume of traffic for the State of Salzburg is updated every minute. The Android App: Google play: Verkehr in Salzburg
- IKS develops an open source stack for knowledge management, broadens the reach of semantic CMS technology and serves as a collaboration and software development hub for the semantic CMS community; The open-source software Apache Marmotta and Apache Stanbol emerged from this research project.
- iCardea developed an intelligent platform to automate and personalise the follow-up of the cardiac patients with implantable devices.

Furthermore, Salzburg Research co-ordinated the Competence Centers Salzburg NewMediaLab (SNML) (2000-2013) in the area of New Media, ANET (2006-2009) and e-motion (2009-2011) in the field of e-Tourism and since November 2018 the COMET-Project Digital-Motion (DiMo) in Sports, Fitness and Well-being (2018-2022).

== Related ==
- Apache Marmotta
- Apache Stanbol
