= Generative Problem Solving =

AI field of problem generation and solving

Generative Problem Solving (GPS) is an area of artificial intelligence that is concerned with the generation, representation, verification, and solution of computational problems. It was introduced by Phillip C.-Y. Sheu and his students in a 2025 conference paper.

While Generative Artificial Intelligence (GenAI), another subfield of artificial intelligence (AI), uses generative models to generate text, images, videos, audio, software code or other forms of data, Generative Problem Solving uses computational methods to generate the spaces of problems, data, use cases, scenarios and solve complex problems where the process and solutions are verifiable.

== Background and development ==
GPS can be viewed as an instrument for discovering the unknown in the problem space. Most problem-solving methods start with a problem that has already been defined. Generative Problem Solving also looks at how new problems can be created. It examines which problems can be generated, whether this process can be carried out systematically, and how the resulting problems can be solved and used to develop further knowledge.

GPS connects problem generation with formal representations, verification procedures, and computational methods for finding solutions. Its current development has included work on logical reasoning, relational databases, and graph-based optimization.

In 2025, Hsiang-Shun Shih's doctoral research examined the generation of logical puzzles and the construction of networks based on specified influence relationships. The work investigated how new tasks could be generated and checked for logical consistency.

In 2026, Goli Vaisi and Sheu presented GPS-Relational, a framework for generating and verifying problems involving relational databases. The work examined how natural-language questions could be translated into executable SQL queries and how generated problems could be used to evaluate AI systems.

Other work has applied GPS to shortest-path optimization. The GPS-SP framework generates problems with different combinations of constraints and uses specialized algorithms to solve them. Chengheng Lyu's doctoral research has also examined logical reasoning, shortest-path problems, and association rules.

== Related work ==
Generative Problem Solving draws on established methods in artificial intelligence, including symbolic reasoning, formal problem representation, and computational optimization. Related work in semantic computing has also examined the use of semantic information to connect data and computational processes with the problems they are intended to address.

Research on AI-assisted creative problem-solving has explored how generative AI systems can contribute to the development of creative solutions to open-ended problems. This broader field is related to GPS with a scope narrower than GPS.
