= Journal of Big Data =

Scientific journal

- Discipline: Big data
- Language: English

Publication details
- History: 2014-present
- Publisher: SpringerOpen (Germany)
- Open access: yes
- ISO 4: Find out here

Indexing
- ISSN: 2196-1115
- OCLC no.: 884468200

Links
- Journal homepage

Journal of Big Data is a scientific journal that publishes open-access original research on big data. Published by SpringerOpen since 2014, it examines data capture and storage; search, sharing, and analytics; big data technologies; data visualization; architectures for massively parallel processing; data mining tools and techniques; machine learning algorithms for big data; cloud computing platforms; distributed file systems and databases; and scalable storage systems.

All articles are included in:

- ESCI
- Scopus
- DLBP
- DOAJ
- ProQuest
- EBSCO Discover Service
