= Community indicators =

Measurements of local data and trends

Community indicators are "measurements that provide information about past and current trends and assist planners and community leaders in making decisions that affect future outcomes". They provide insight into the overall direction of a community: whether it is improving, declining, or staying the same, or is some mix of all three.

In essence, indicators are measurements that reflect the interplay between social, environmental, and economic factors affecting a region’s or community’s well-being. Community indicators projects typically are conducted by non-profit organizations within a community, although in some cases they are initiated by the public sector.

== History ==
Community indicators are a localized response to the perceived invalidity of the traditional predominantly economic indicators, such as GDP, that are used for measuring human progress. This invalidity takes two forms. First, economic indicators account for all money transactions as beneficial for quality of life, whereas some of these can be seen as decidedly negative (e.g., money spent on environmental cleanup of pollution that could have been prevented). Secondly, strictly economic indicators do not count the value of non-monetary activity, such as homemaker and volunteer work and non-cash public assistance, which are decidedly positive for the quality of life of many families (Journal article by David Swain, Danielle Hollar; International Journal of Public Administration, Vol. 26, 2003).

A communities level approach to this apparent invalidity is based on the evidence of a social group whose members reside in a specific locality, share government, and often have a common culture and history. Community indicators are not a new concept; they have been in use since 1910, when the Russell Sage Foundation initiated the development of local surveys for measuring industrial, educational, recreational, and other factors. The processes used by the Sage Foundation are similar to those that reemerged during the 1990s. But the difference today is the use of indicators to consider the full spectrum of a community’s well-being, not just isolated factors. Nowadays, indicators are used by many constituencies within a community. After a decade of renewed attention to community indicators, they now represent a valuable mechanism to improve monitoring and evaluation in planning.

Russell Sage Foundation employed “over two thousand local surveys taken on education, recreation, public health, crime, and general social conditions” to assess social conditions. The first survey was conducted in Pittsburgh, Pennsylvania. (In the late 1990s, Pittsburgh again embraced indicators, with its Sustainable Pittsburgh Goals and Indicators Project.) Many of the surveys used by the Sage Foundation were conducted by nonprofit organizations, such as chambers of commerce and citizen committees. These surveys yielded social trends indicators and were popular until the Great Depression and World War II, when economic measures such as the gross domestic product or gross national product indicators took greater precedence

== Community information systems objectives ==
Community information systems (CIS) bring together a wide range of community indicators — social, economic and environmental data and information around objectives:

- Monitoring the health, social well-being and sustainability of communities through the management of Quality of Life indicators;
- Bringing together government performance indicators and community targeted indicators into a single solution;
- Widening the use of data by citizens and public officials to support decision-making, improve policy and target resources;
- Providing a wider local intelligence context to key performance indicators for government officials;
- Communicating outcome measures to citizens, stimulating public debate and building confidence in progress towards societal goals.

== See also ==
- Circles of Sustainability
- Engaged theory
- Open Semantic Framework
- Quality of life
- Social change
- Sociology
