= Performance indicator =

Measurement that evaluates the success of an organization

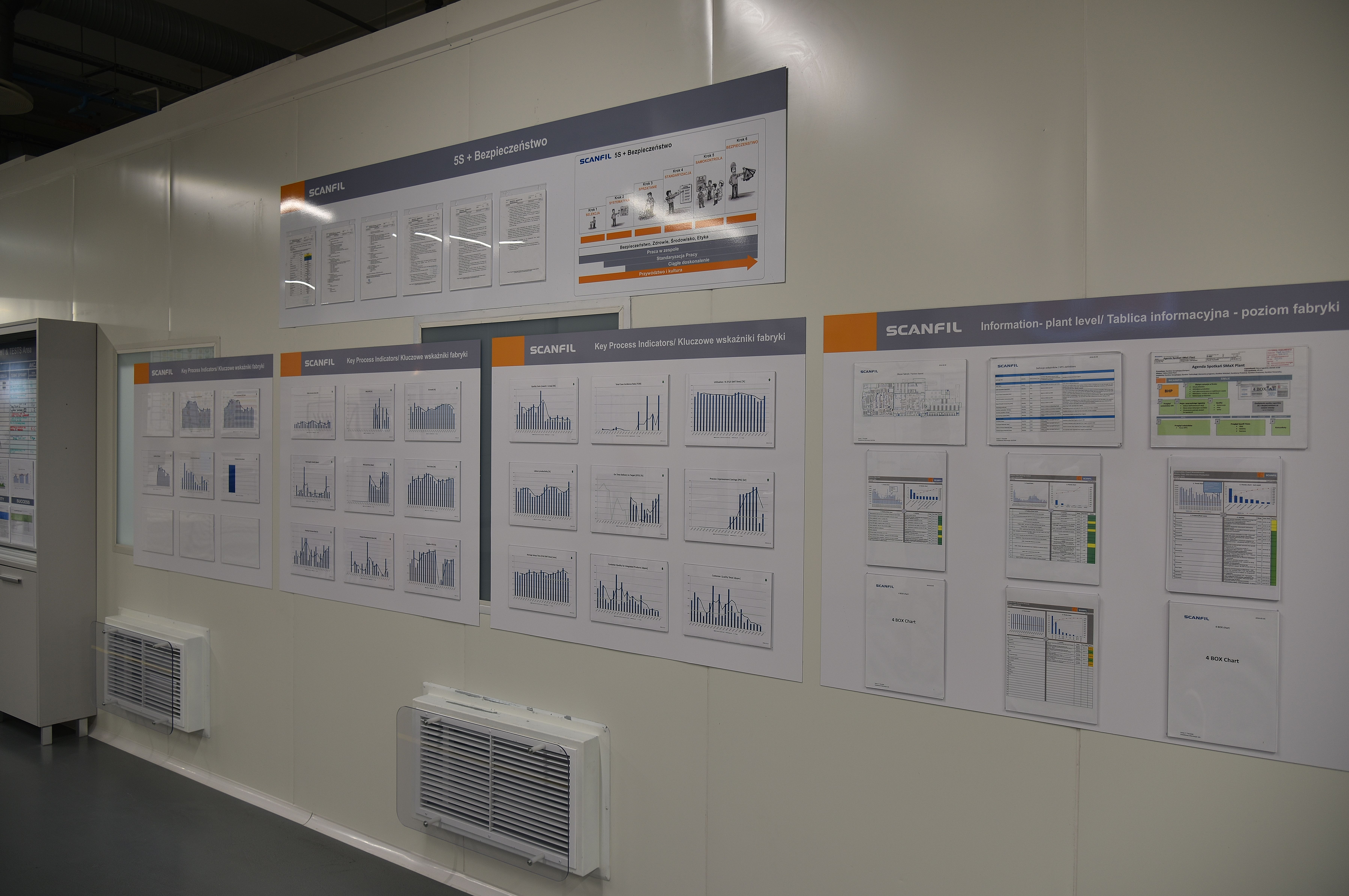
KPI information boards

A performance indicator or key performance indicator (KPI) is a type of performance measurement used to evaluate the success of an organization, activity, project, or process in achieving defined objectives. KPIs provide a focus for strategic and operational improvement, support evidence-based decision-making, and help organizations identify and monitor factors critical to performance.

KPIs may measure progress toward operational targets such as quality levels, efficiency, or customer satisfaction or toward broader strategic goals. The selection of appropriate KPIs depends on an organization’s priorities and context, and indicators often differ across functional areas such as finance, sales, operations, or human resources. Management frameworks such as the balanced scorecard are commonly used to structure KPI selection and align measurement with strategy.

Performance indicators are applied across sectors including business, government, healthcare, and technical systems. Their effectiveness depends on clear definition, reliable data, and appropriate interpretation, as poorly designed indicators may create unintended incentives or fail to capture meaningful outcomes.

KPIs are used not only for business organizations but also for technical aspects such as machine performance. For example, a machine used for production in a factory would output various signals indicating how the current machine status is (e.g., machine sensor signals). Some signals or signals as a result of processing the existing signals may represent the high-level machine performance. These representative signals can be KPI for the machine.

== Categorisation of performance indicators ==
The effective use of performance indicators requires a clear understanding of their different types and purposes. Indicators can be categorised along several key dimensions to ensure a balanced and comprehensive measurement system that supports strategic objectives. A well-designed set of indicators will draw from multiple categories to avoid unintended consequences and provide a holistic view of organisational performance.

A primary method of categorisation is based on the dimension of performance being measured. The balanced scorecard framework, for instance, groups indicators into four perspectives: financial (e.g., profitability), customer (e.g., satisfaction), internal business processes (e.g., efficiency), and learning and growth (e.g., innovation). This approach prevents over-reliance on financial metrics alone.

Indicators are also commonly distinguished by their time orientation and function. In this typology:

- Lagging indicators are outcome-oriented, measuring the final results of past activities (e.g., annual revenue, year-end safety incident count). They are easy to measure but hard to directly influence.
- Leading indicators are performance drivers, predictive measures that influence future outcomes (e.g., number of client proposals, hours of safety training completed). They are more actionable but can be harder to correlate directly with results.
- Input indicators measure resources consumed (e.g., budget spent, staff hours), providing context for interpreting outputs and outcomes.

Another critical distinction is based on the nature of the data. Quantitative indicators provide objective, numerical measurement (e.g., unit output, error rates), while qualitative indicators capture subjective, often perceptual data (e.g., stakeholder satisfaction, brand reputation) typically gathered through surveys and interviews.

Furthermore, indicators can be designed for different levels of the organisation. Strategic indicators monitor progress toward top-level goals, operational indicators track departmental or process efficiency, and individual indicators align personal objectives with organisational priorities.

Selecting the right mix of categories is a strategic exercise. An overemphasis on lagging quantitative indicators can lead to short-termism and "gaming" of metrics, while focusing solely on leading or qualitative indicators may lack a connection to ultimate outcomes. A balanced portfolio of indicators across these categories is therefore essential for effective performance management.

== Points of measurement ==
The first step in performance measurement is determining what to measure.

Performance indictors may be applied at various stages within a programme, service, or organisational process. These points capture distinct dimensions of performance, ranging from the earliest stages of resource allocation to final outcomes achieved. It is common to distinguish between:

- Inputs – the resources (financial, human, or material) dedicated to an activity.
- Processes – how efficiently or effectively these resources are transformed into outputs.
- Outputs – the quantity, quality and timeliness of goods or services delivered.
- Impacts – the short to medium term effects on service users or stakeholders.
- Outcomes – the broader, long term societal changes that result from an activity.

Mapping indicators across this continuum helps ensure measurement provides a clear picture of performance. The points of measurement may also relate to the relationship between inputs and outputs (productivity), and outputs and outcome (effectiveness). Control (the extent to which employees can influence a result) and mechanism (the causal link between employees’ effort and a performance dimension) further shape measurement decisions.

Selecting the appropriate point of measurement is not simply a technical choice but also a strategic one. For example, focusing narrowly on inputs or outputs can incentivise ‘box-ticking’ behaviours and obscure whether real value is being created. Conversely, outcome and impact indicators may be harder to attribute to organisational effort, especially in complex public sector environments.

A balanced approach can involve linking indicators across multiple points of measurement, to trace the relationships between resources, activities and ultimate value. However, this requires careful design to avoid measurement burdens and to ensure alignment with an organisation’s overall strategic objectives.

Quality assurance across the points of measurement helps ensure indicators not only track activity levels but also produce robust, consistent and credible performance data.

== Identifying indicators ==
Once appropriate points of measurement have been determined, the next task is to identify specific indicators that meaningfully capture performance at that stage. An indicator is a measurable variable used to show whether progress is being made towards a goal, rather than the goal itself.

Choice of indicators reflects managerial decisions about what counts as successful performance. Indicators may be financial, such as revenue growth, or non-financial, such as customer satisfaction rates. A good indicator should be simple to understand while aligning closely with business or organisational goals.

The process of identifying indicators is often guided by frameworks such as SMART (specific, measurable, achievable, relevant, time-bound). Alternatives like the FABRIC principles emphasise ideal performance information is focused, appropriate, balanced, robust, integrated, and cost-effective.

In the public sector, where outcomes may depend on many different organisations and external influences, careful selection is needed to avoid misleading or overly broad results.

Key stages of identifying a performance indicator include:

- Clarifying objectives: defining the goals, benchmarks, and standard to be measured.
- Choosing the point of measurement: deciding whether inputs, outputs, impacts or outcomes best capture performance.
- Generating potential indicators: identifying options from existing data or stakeholder input.
- Assessing validity and feasibility: testing whether indicators are conceptually sound, measurable, and proportionate.
- Piloting and refining: trialling indicators to detect unintended incentives or data issues.
- Final selection and integration: embedding chosen indicators into reporting and decision-making.

Beyond the technical steps, several broader considerations shape indicator usefulness. Indicators must be simple enough for managers and other stakeholders, including shareholders or the public, to understand but precise enough to capture what matters. Over-simplified indicators may distort or fail to drive performance, while overly complex or too numerous indicators may fail to gain traction.

Attribution is another challenge. In the public sector, multiple organisations may influence outcomes indicators, and may sometimes develop a shared outcomes framework with reporting to show the particular role an individual organisation. Where a clear link exists between employee effort and performance, indicators may be connected to motivation, reward and appraisal systems.

Data quality is another important consideration. Indicators depend on reliable and consistent information. Weak systems can undermine credibility, shaping which indicators are ultimately preferred. Finally, given the risks of gaming, data fabrication, and selective reporting on indictors, organisations should consider verifiability of underlying data when selecting indicators and choose indicators that are not susceptible to manipulation.

== Examples ==
=== Accounts ===
These are some of the examples:

- Percentage of overdue invoices
- Percentage of purchase orders raised in advance
- Number of retrospectively raised purchase orders
- Finance report error rate (measures the quality of the report)
- Average cycle time of workflow
- Number of duplicate payments

=== Marketing and sales ===
- New customer acquisition
- Customer acquisition cost (CAC)
- Average deal size
- Demographic analysis of individuals (potential customers) applying to become customers, and the levels of approval, rejections, and pending numbers
- Status of existing customers
- Customer density (the proportion of revenue attributable to a specified percentage of accounts, which ideally should match, for example the top 10% of accounts should broadly contribute 10% of revenue)
- Customer attrition (the loss of clients or customers)
- Turnover (i.e., revenue) generated by segments of the customer population
- Outstanding balances held by segments of customers and terms of payment
- Collection of bad debts within customer relationships
- Profitability of customers by demographic segments and segmentation of customers by profitability

Many of these customer KPIs are developed and managed with customer relationship management software.

Faster availability of data is a competitive issue for most organizations. For example, businesses that have higher operational/credit risk (involving for example credit cards or wealth management) may want weekly or even daily availability of KPI analysis, facilitated by appropriate IT systems and tools.

=== Manufacturing ===
Overall equipment effectiveness (OEE) is a set of broadly accepted nonfinancial metrics that reflect manufacturing success.

- OEE = availability x performance x quality
- Availability = run time / total time; by definition this is the percentage of the actual amount of production time the machine is running to the production time the machine is available.
- Down time = time the building/ location/ service/ machine is out of operation due to any reason (including planned down time such as maintenance or 'out of season').
- Performance = total count / target counter, by definition this is the percentage of total parts produced on the machine to the production rate of machine.
- Quality = good count / total count, by definition, this is the percentage of good parts out of the total parts produced on the machine.
- Cycle time ratio (CTR) = standard cycle time / real cycle time
- Capacity utilization
- Rejection rate

=== Professional services ===
Most professional services firms (for example, management consultancies, systems integration firms, or digital marketing agencies) use three key performance indicators to track the health of their businesses. They typically use professional services automation (PSA) software to keep track of and manage these metrics.

- Utilization rate = the percentage of time employees spend generating revenue
- Project profitability = the difference between the revenue generated by a project and the cost of delivering the work
- Project success rate = the percentage of projects delivered on time and under budget

=== System operations ===
- Availability / uptime
- Mean time between failures
- Mean time to repair
- Unplanned availability
- Unplanned downtime
- Average time to repair

=== Project execution ===
- Earned value
- Cost variance or cost performance index
- Schedule variance or schedule performance index
- Estimate to complete
- Manpower spent / month
- Money spent / month
- Planned spend / month
- Planned manpower / month
- Average time to delivery
- Tasks / staff
- Project overhead / ROI
- Planned delivery date vs actual delivery date

=== Supply chain management ===
Businesses can utilize supply chain KPIs to establish and monitor progress toward a variety of goals, including lean manufacturing objectives, minority business enterprise and diversity spending, environmental "green" initiatives, cost avoidance programs and low-cost country sourcing targets. Suppliers can implement KPIs to gain a competitive advantage. Suppliers have instant access to a user-friendly portal for submitting standardized cost savings templates. Suppliers and their customers exchange vital supply chain performance data while gaining visibility to the exact status of cost improvement projects and cost savings documentation.

Any business, regardless of size, can better manage supplier performance and overall supply chain performance, with the help of KPIs' robust capabilities, which include:

- Automated entry and approval functions
- On-demand, real-time scorecard measures
- Rework on procured inventory
- Single data repository to eliminate inefficiencies and maintain consistency
- Advanced workflow approval process to ensure consistent procedures
- Flexible data-input modes and real-time graphical performance displays
- Customized cost savings documentation
- Simplified setup procedures to eliminate dependence upon IT resources

Main KPIs for supply chain management will detail the following processes:

- Sales forecasts
- Inventory
- Procurement and suppliers
- Warehousing
- Transportation
- Reverse logistics

In a warehouse, the manager will use KPIs that target best use of the facility, like the receiving and put away KPIs to measure the receiving efficiency and the putaway cost per line. Storage KPIs can also be used to determine the efficiency of the storage space and the carrying cost of the inventory.

=== Government ===
Governments around the world have adopted performance indicators as part of broader performance management reforms. These initiatives emerged from general concerns about performance deficits in the public sector, and the belief that systematic measurement could improve accountability and outcomes. While governments have established extensive systems for collecting performance data, research suggests that the value of these indicators depends on whether managers effectively use the information in their decision-making processes.

Factors influencing the use of performance data include individual values, leadership roles, organisational culture, and external pressures. Managers with strong public service motivation are more likely to engage with performance information because they see it as a means of achieving public goals. Leadership roles also matter. Task-specific leaders often use indicators more actively than generalist leaders who face broader political responsibilities. Organisational cultures that emphasise learning, flexibility, and innovation are more likely to foster the use of performance information, whereas rigid or highly centralised environments may discourage it. Citizen participation can also create demand for greater accountability, encouraging managers to apply performance data to justify decisions and demonstrate transparency.

International examples show the diversity of approaches. The provincial government of Ontario, Canada has used performance indicators since the late 1990s to assess higher education institutions, reporting on measures such as graduate satisfaction, employment rates, and student outcomes. In England, Public Health England applies indicators to monitor national health screening programmes, while UK government departments publish key contract-related indicators to improve service transparency. The United States requires federal agencies to set strategic goals and report on progress under the Government Performance and Results Act. The New Zealand Treasury’s Living Standards Framework and associated wellbeing indicators provide a broader set of measures that move beyond economic performance to social and environmental outcomes.

Although performance indicators are now widespread, their effectiveness remains debated. It can be argued that indicators oversimplify complex goals, encourage symbolic compliance, and shift attention to what is easily measurable rather than what is substantively important. On the other hand, when well-designed and used within supportive cultures, indicators can strengthen accountability, guide learning, and improve service delivery.

=== Human resource management ===
Performance indicators are widely used in human resource management (HRM) to assess recruitment, retention, performance, and employee well-being. In the public sector, these measures are shaped by distinctive institutional constraints and workforce motivations. Common HRM indicators include employee turnover rates, time to fill vacancies, absenteeism, staff satisfaction, and survey results.

The effectiveness of HRM practices has been examined across public, semi-public, and private organisations. A large meta-analysis using the ability-motivation-opportunity (AMO) framework found that HRM practices positively influence individual performance in all sectors, but with sector-specific variations. Ability-enhancing practices such as training and selective recruitment are consistently associated with higher job satisfaction and performance. Motivation-enhancing practices, such as performance-based pay, show weaker impacts in public organisations, where employees are often driven more by intrinsic and altruistic motivations than extrinsic rewards. Opportunity-enhancing practices, such as participatory decision-making and job autonomy, appear particularly important in encouraging extra-role behaviours like collaboration and knowledge-sharing.

Employee turnover is a critical indicator for HRM. While traditionally seen as negative, research suggests that turnover may have more complex effects. A study of several hundred public school districts in Texas over nine years found that turnover was linearly negative for basic educational outcomes, such as standardised test scores, but showed a non-linear “inverted U-shaped” relationship with more complex outcomes like college readiness. This indicates that low to moderate turnover may introduce new skills and perspectives, benefiting organisational performance, while very high turnover imposes significant costs and reduces effectiveness.

Other HRM indicators reflect absenteeism, which is often monitored as a proxy for workforce wellbeing and organisational health. Staff satisfaction surveys are also commonly used to measure morale, commitment, and engagement, though their interpretation may be shaped by broader organisational culture and leadership practices.

=== Other performance indicators ===
- Duration of a stockout situation

$$\text{ROC} = \frac{\text{Close}-\text{Close (Past)}}{\text{Close (Past)}}\times100$$

- Customer order waiting time

== Problems ==
Performance Indicators (PIs) are widely used to measure, manage and provide public accountability across sectors like healthcare, business, education and government. However, they can have challenges and limitations that may affect data accuracy, relevance, and effectiveness if not carefully considered. In practice, overseeing key performance indicators can prove expensive or difficult for organizations. Some indicators such as staff morale may be impossible to quantify. As such, dubious KPIs can be adopted that can be used as a rough guide rather than a precise benchmark.

Key performance indicators can also lead to perverse incentives and unintended consequences as a result of employees working to the specific measurements at the expense of the actual quality or value of their work.

Sometimes, collecting statistics can become a substitute for a better understanding of the problems, so the use of dubious KPIs can result in progress in aims and measured effectiveness becoming different. For example, during the Vietnam War, US soldiers were shown to be effective in kill ratios and high body counts, but this was misleading when used to measure aims as it did not show the lack of progress towards the US goal of increasing South Vietnamese government control of its territory. Another example would be to measure the productivity of a software development team in terms of lines of source code written. This approach can easily add large amounts of dubious code, thereby inflating the line count but adding little value in terms of systemic improvement. A similar problem arises when a footballer kicks a ball uselessly to build up their statistics.

Here are some potential problems, examples and impacts with performance indicators:

Issue	Problem	Example	Impact
Overemphasis on quantitative metrics	Performance indicators may focus on easily-measured metrics (e.g., numbers, rates, targets). This can lead to neglect of qualitative aspects, which miss nuance if overlooked.	Ensuring midwifery success by number of births attended ignores safety and patient experience.	This can lead to a narrow view of success and overlook important but less tangible outcomes.
Misalignment with strategic goals	Indicators may not reflect priorities or what truly matters to the organisation or stakeholders.	Focusing on speed of service rather than safety checks to meet production targets.	If performance indicators are chosen poorly, employees may focus on the wrong priorities or feel disconnected from the metric, leading to disengagement or misdirected efforts.
Gaming the system	When performance is reward- or penalty-based, employees may manipulate data or only focus on what is measured to meet targets rather than improve actual performance.	Rushing patient discharges to meet bed turnover targets when it impacts care.	Perverse incentives undermine data integrity and lead to unintended consequences, such as neglecting unmeasured areas in quality of patient care.
Data quality and reliability	Inaccurate, incomplete, or time-sensitive data can lead to distorted performance indicators.	Manual data entry or inconsistent, unclear definitions can interfere with results. Alternatively, annual staff satisfaction surveys may be too late to address emerging issues.	Decisions based on flawed data can lead to poor outcomes, misinformed strategies or misleading conclusions.
Demotivation, stress and burden of measurement	Constant monitoring pressure or unrealistic punitive performance indicators can be time-consuming and resource-intensive, leading to stress, burnout, or reduced job satisfaction.	Employees may feel pressured to meet numbers rather than focus on meaningful or relevant work.	This can feel intrusive and reduce autonomy, affecting employee well-being and retention, particularly in high-pressure environments.
Equity blindness	Performance indicators may not account for differences in ethnicity, culture, demographics or external factors (e.g., socioeconomic conditions, staffing shortages, policy changes).	Using standardised benchmarks without adjusting for context (e.g., rural vs. urban) can penalise communities or individuals unfairly.	Comparisons across businesses or organisations may be unfair or misleading, resulting in misguided policy decisions, reinforcing systemic inequities and missed opportunities for improvements.
Tunnel vision	Focusing narrowly on measurable performance indicators can neglect unmeasured broader metrics.	Emphasising efficiency and patient flow might reduce time spent on compassionate, holistic care.	This can lead to distorted decision-making and unintended consequences.

=== Mitigation ===
Strategies to address and mitigate problems with PIs requires a thoughtful, systemic approach. Examples to guide this process are:

Design Indicators for Relevance and Fairness

- Ensure PIs reflect meaningful outcomes, not only measurable outputs.
- Avoid one-size -fits-all metrics: customise indicators to fit context.
- Review regularly: ensure indicators evolve with organisational goals and realities.
- Include qualitative indicators: balance numbers with narratives (e.g., consumer feedback).

Transparency and Participation

- Co-design PIs with employees: involve frontline workers in developing indicators to ensure relevance and reflection of real work and values.
- Clarify expectations: make sure staff understand what is being measured, why, and how it will be used.
- Provide feedback loops: share results regularly and use them for learning.

Monitor for Gaming and Goal Shift

- Audit for unintended consequences: check if indicators are encouraging shortcuts or superficial compliance.
- Reward integrity and innovation, not just target-hitting.
- Use a balance of mixed indicators: triangulate data by combining quantitative and qualitative data to get a fuller picture.

Reduce Monitoring Burden

- Streamline data collection: use integrated systems to avoid duplication and manual reporting.
- Limit frequency: avoid constant tracking; use periodic reviews that allow time for reflection and improvement.
- Automate where possible: leverage technology to reduce administrative burden

Equity-Minded Alternatives

- Use disaggregated data to reveal disparity.
- Include contextual factors like social determinants.
- Promote inclusive practices in evaluation and improvement efforts.

Further examples may include in nursing, replacing rigid throughput metrics with indicators that reflect quality of care, and patient experience. In education, balance test scores with indicators of student engagement and learning environment quality. Finally, in public services, include metrics for community impact and equity alongside traditional efficiency indicators.

== See also ==
- Business intelligence
- Business performance management
- Community indicators
- Critical success factor
- Dashboarding
- Data presentation architecture
- Figure of merit
- Gap analysis
- Goodhart's law
- ITIL
- Key risk indicator
- Match performance indicator
- Network performance
- Objectives and key results (OKRs)
- Overall equipment effectiveness
- Strategy Markup Language
- Supplier relationship management (SRM)
