= Apache Marmotta =

Software platform for linked data

- Developer: Apache Software Foundation
- Initial release: October 3, 2013; 12 years ago
- Final release: 3.4.0 / June 12, 2018; 7 years ago
- Written in: Java
- Available in: English
- Type: Triplestore, rule reasoner
- License: Apache License 2.0
- Website: marmotta.apache.org
- Repository: Marmotta Repository

Apache Marmotta is a linked data platform that comprises several components. In its most basic configuration it is a Linked Data server. Marmotta is one of the reference projects early implementing the new Linked Data Platform recommendation that is being developed by W3C.

It has been contributed by Salzburg Research from the Linked Media Framework, and continues its versioning, hence starting at version 3.0.0.

Since April 2013, it is listed among the Semantic Web tools by the W3C.

In November 2020, it was retired to the Apache Attic, meaning that the project is no longer being developed.

== Components ==
The project is split in several parts: the platform itself, which includes full Read Write Linked Data, SPARQL, LDP, Reasoning, and basic security. In addition to the platform, the project develops some libraries can also be used separately:

- KiWi, a Triplestore built on top of a relational database.
- LDPath, a path language to navigate across Linked Data resources.
- LDClient, a Linked Data client that allows retrieval of remote resources via different protocols by making use of pluggable adapters (data providers) that wrap other data sources (such as YouTube and Facebook).
- LDCache, a cache system that automatically retrieves resources by internally using LDClient.

== History ==
=== Linked Media Framework (pre-Apache) ===
Apache Marmotta is the continuation of the open source Linked Media Framework published in early 2012.

=== Apache Marmotta ===
- On November 16, 2012 it is proposed to the Apache Software Foundation under the name of Apache Linda, later changed to Apache Marmotta in order to avoid confusion with the Linda language.
- On 3 December 2012 Marmotta enters incubation.
- On April 26, 2013 Marmotta 3.0.0-incubating is released.
- On October 3, 2013 Marmotta 3.1.0-incubating is released.
- In November 2013, it graduated as top-level project.
- In April 2014, the project released its first actual release under the umbrella of the Apache Software Foundation: 3.2.0 version.
- On 5 December 2014, the project published the version 3.3.0.

== Notable users ==
- The backend of Salzburger Nachrichten's search and archive is powered by Marmotta.
- Enel uses Marmotta for its Open Data portal.
- The cloud infrastructure of Redlink is powered by Marmotta.
- It is being used by some European research projects such as Fusepool and MICO (Media in Context).
- Digital Public Library of America uses Marmotta to run LDP server and RDF repository.

== Bibliography ==
- Bachmann-Gmur, Reto (July 26, 2013). Instant Apache Stanbol (1st ed.). Packt Publishing. ISBN 978-1783281237.
- Kaschesky, Michael; Selmi, Luigi (June 2013). Fusepool R5 linked data framework: concepts, methodologies, and tools for linked data. ACM New York. pp. 156–165. ISBN 978-1-4503-2057-3.
- Zukunft Von Linked Media: Trends, Entwicklungen Und Visionen [The future of Linked Media: trends, discoveries and visions.] (in German) (1st ed.). Salzburg Research Forschungsgesellschaft. 14 May 2013. ISBN 978-3902448361.
- Qualitätssicherung Bei Annotationen [Quality assurance in annotations] (in German). Salzburg Research Forschungsgesellschaft. 2 January 2013. ISBN 978-3902448323.
- Hassnaa, Moustafa; Zeadally, Sherali, eds. (14 May 2012). Media Networks: Architectures, Applications, and Standards. CRC Press. ISBN 9781439877289. "an ongoing open source development used to demonstrate the concepts of semantic lifting and interlinking of media resources"
- Linked Media Interfaces. Salzburg Research Forschungsgesellschaft. 5 October 2011. ISBN 978-3902448293.
- Linked Media. Ein White-Paper zu den Potentialen von Linked People, Linked Content und Linked Data [A white paper on the potential of Linked People, Linked Content and Linked Data.] (in German). Salzburg Research Forschungsgesellschaft. 26 April 2011. p. 8. ISBN 978-3902448279.
