= Telehealth =

Health care by telecommunication

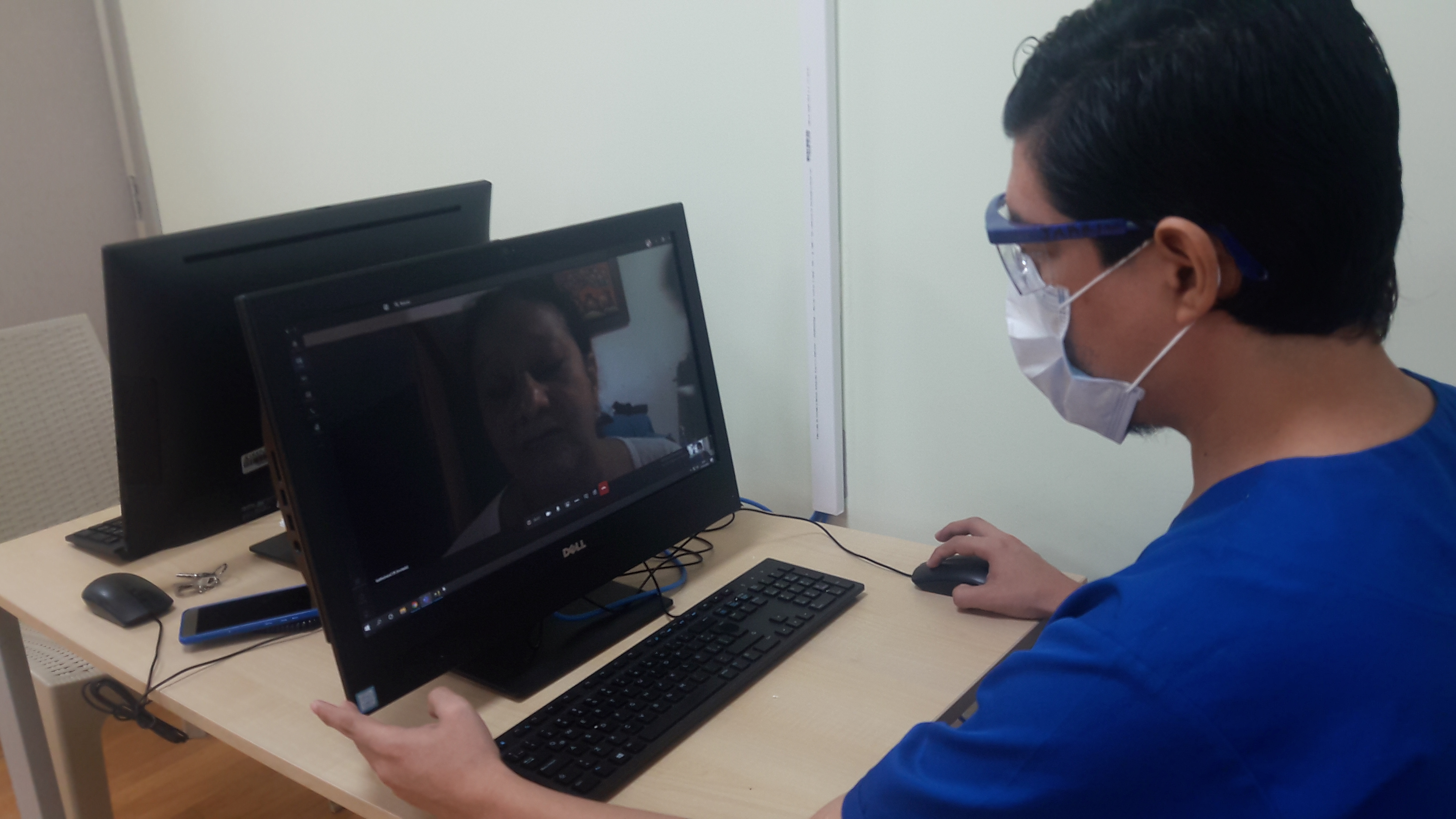
Telehealth

Telehealth is the use of electronic information and telecommunication technologies to support long-distance clinical health care, patient and professional health-related education, health administration, and public health. This includes data sharing by way of patient portals and electronic medical records. Telehealth encompasses a broad range of technologies and services used to provide patient care, health education, public health services, and health administration remotely using telecommunications technologies.

Telemedicine is sometimes used as a synonym but is actually a subset of telehealth. The Federation of State Medical Boards defines telemedicine as "the practice of medicine using electronic communication, information technology, or other means between a physician in one location, and a patient in another location, with or without an intervening health care provider." When rural settings, lack of transport, a lack of mobility, conditions due to outbreaks, epidemics or pandemics, decreased funding, or a lack of staff restrict access to care, telemedicine may bridge the gap and can even improve retention in treatment as well as provide distance-learning; meetings, supervision, and presentations between practitioners; online information and health data management and healthcare system integration. EHealth encompasses a wide range of applications, including but not limited to the following:

- Two clinicians discussing a case via video conference;
- Robotic surgery performed through remote access;
- Physical therapy conducted using digital monitoring instruments, live feed, and application combinations;
- Diagnostic tests transferred between facilities for interpretation by a higher specialist;
- Home monitoring through continuous transmission of patient health data;
- Online consultations between patients and practitioners;
- Video remote interpretation services for clinical visits.

== Telehealth versus telemedicine ==
Telehealth is sometimes discussed interchangeably with telemedicine, the latter being more common than the former. Telehealth has been described as a disruptive innovation in healthcare because it enables medical services to be delivered remotely using communication technologies. The Health Resources and Services Administration distinguishes telehealth from telemedicine in its scope, defining telemedicine only as describing remote clinical services, such as diagnosis and monitoring, while telehealth includes preventative, promotive, and curative care delivery. This includes the above-mentioned non-clinical applications, like administration and provider education.

The United States Department of Health and Human Services states that the term telehealth includes "non-clinical services, such as provider training, administrative meetings, and continuing medical education", and that the term telemedicine means "remote clinical services". The World Health Organization uses telemedicine to describe all aspects of health care including preventive care. The American Telemedicine Association uses the terms telemedicine and telehealth interchangeably, although it acknowledges that telehealth is sometimes used more broadly for remote health not involving active clinical treatments.

eHealth is another related term, used particularly in the U.K. and Europe, as an umbrella term that includes telehealth, electronic medical records, and other components of health information technology.

== Methods and modalities ==
Telehealth requires good Internet access by participants, usually in the form of a strong, reliable broadband connection, and broadband mobile communication technology of at least the fourth generation (4G) or long-term evolution (LTE) standard to overcome issues with video stability and bandwidth restrictions. As broadband infrastructure has improved, telehealth usage has become more widely feasible.

Healthcare providers often begin telehealth with a needs assessment which assesses hardships that can be improved by telehealth such as travel time, costs or time off work. Collaborators such as technology companies can ease the transition.

Delivery can come within four distinct domains: live video (synchronous), store-and-forward (asynchronous), remote patient monitoring, and mobile health. Audio-based telemedicine, primarily through telephone consultations, has been studied as a tool for managing chronic conditions. A systematic review of 40 randomized controlled trials found that audio-based care was generally comparable to in-person or video care, though with low to very low certainty of evidence.

=== Store and forward ===
Store-and-forward telemedicine (also known as asynchronous telehealth) involves acquiring medical data (like medical images, biosignals etc.) and then transmitting this data to a doctor or medical specialist at a convenient time for assessment offline. It does not require the presence of both parties at the same time. Dermatology (cf: teledermatology), radiology, and pathology are common specialties that are conducive to asynchronous telemedicine. A properly structured medical record, preferably in electronic form, should be a component of this transfer. The 'store-and-forward' process requires the clinician to rely on a history report and audio/video information in lieu of a physical examination.

=== Remote monitoring ===
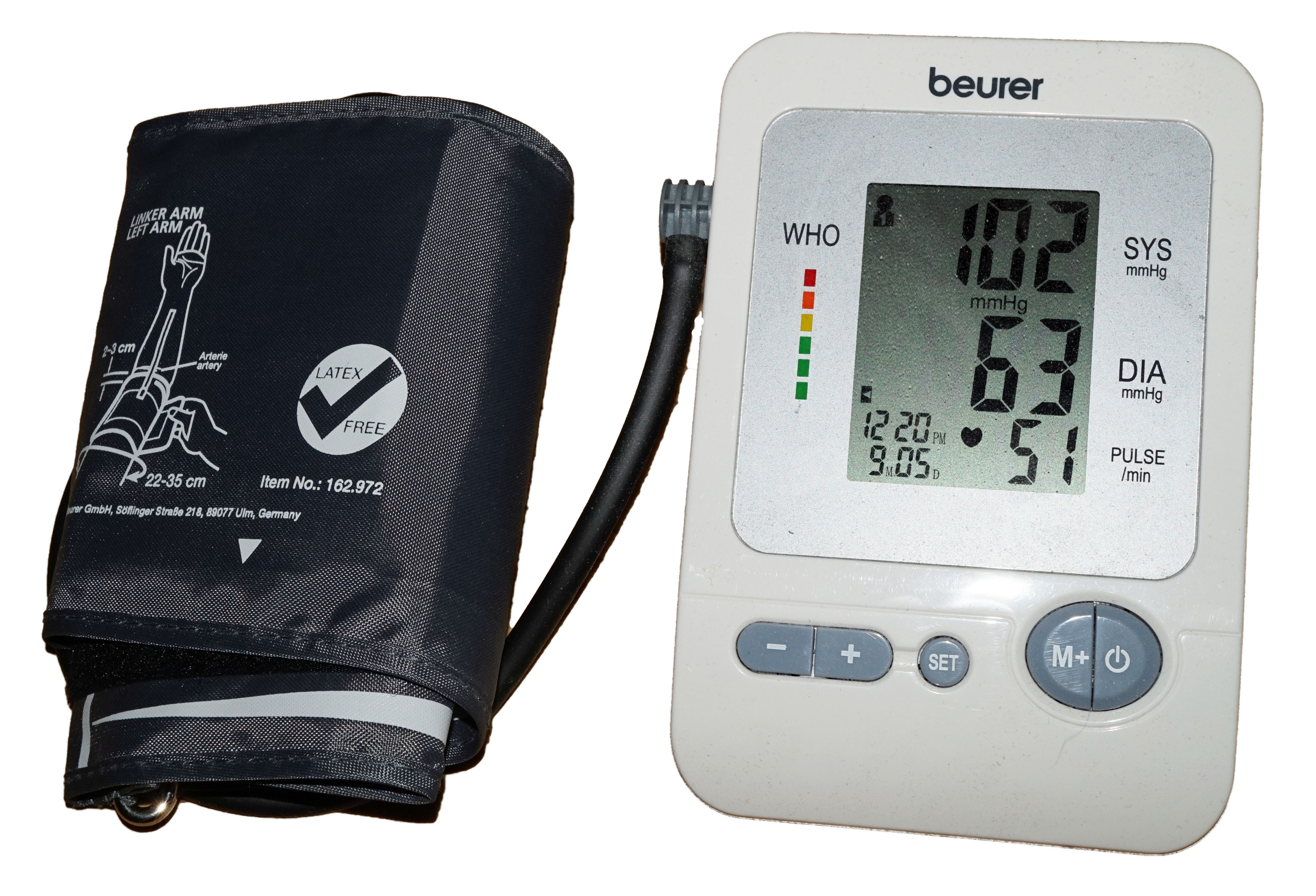
A blood pressure monitor

Remote monitoring, also known as self-monitoring or testing, enables medical professionals to monitor a patient remotely using various technological devices. This method is primarily used for managing chronic diseases or specific conditions, such as heart disease, diabetes mellitus, or asthma. These services can provide comparable health outcomes to traditional in-person patient encounters, supply greater satisfaction to patients, and may be cost-effective. Examples include home-based nocturnal dialysis, improved joint management, and diabetes care using audio-based telemedicine with remote monitoring tools.

=== Real-time interactive ===
Electronic consultations are possible through interactive telemedicine services which provide real-time interactions between patient and provider. Videoconferencing has been used in a wide range of clinical disciplines and settings for various purposes, including management, diagnosis, counseling, and monitoring of patients.

=== Videotelephony ===
Videotelephony comprises the technologies for the reception and transmission of audio-video signals by users at different locations for communication between people in real time.

At the dawn of the technology, videotelephony also included image phones which would exchange still images between units every few seconds over conventional POTS-type telephone lines, essentially the same as slow scan TV systems.

Currently, videotelephony is particularly useful to the deaf and speech-impaired who can use it with sign language and also with a video relay service, as well as to those with mobility issues or those who are located in distant places and are in need of telemedical or tele-educational services.

== Categories ==
=== Emergency care ===
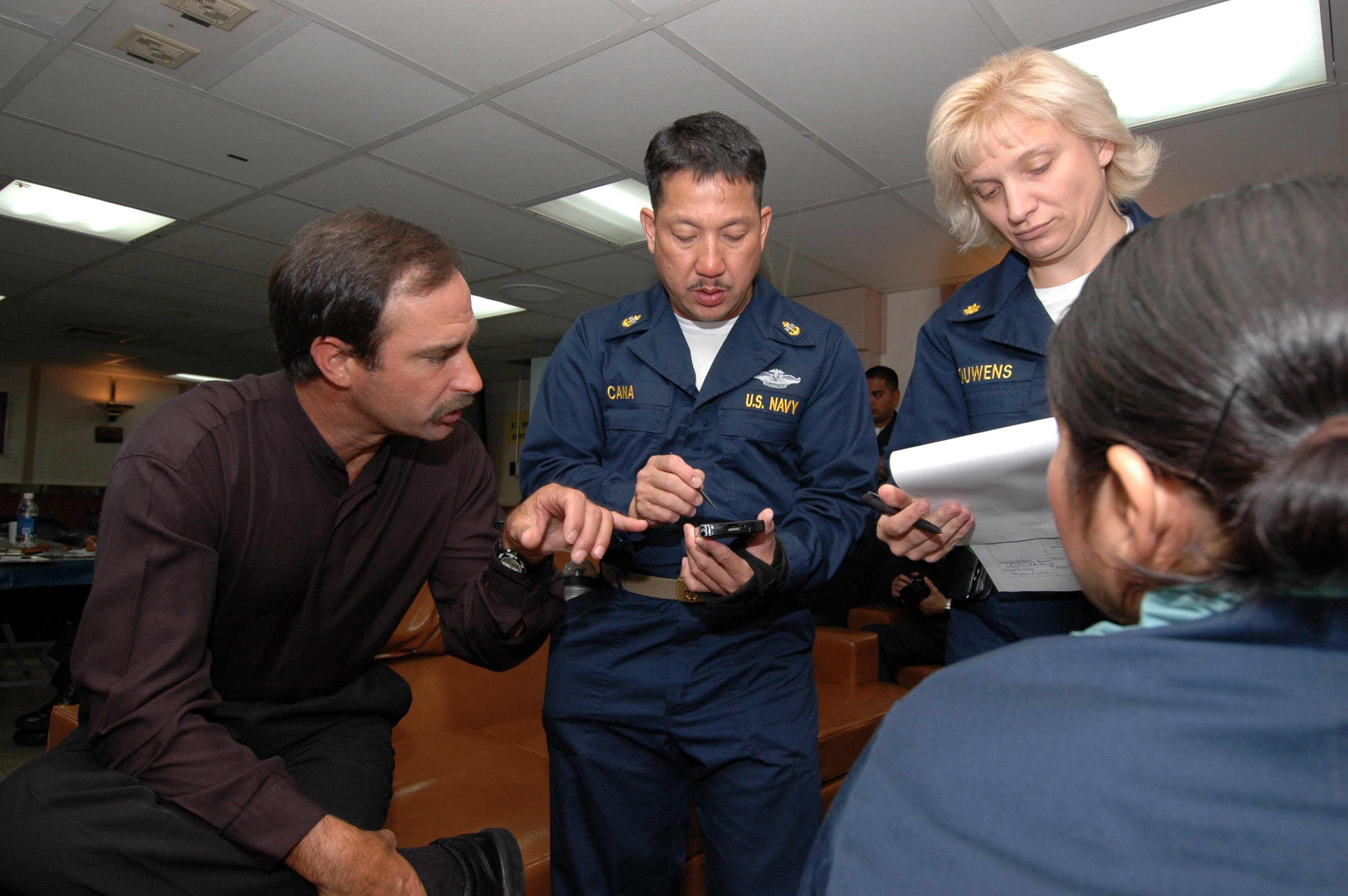
U.S. Navy medical staff being trained in the use of handheld telemedical devices (2006)

Common daily emergency telemedicine is performed by SAMU Regulator Physicians in France, Spain, Chile, and Brazil. Aircraft and maritime emergencies are also handled by SAMU centres in Paris, Lisbon and Toulouse.

A recent study identified three major barriers to the adoption of telemedicine in emergency and critical care units. They include:

- Regulatory challenges related to the difficulty and cost of obtaining licensure across multiple states, malpractice protection and privileges at multiple facilities
- Financial barriers including a lack of acceptance and reimbursement by government payers and some commercial insurance carriers, which places the investment burden squarely upon the hospital or healthcare system.
- Cultural barriers occurring from the lack of desire, or unwillingness, of some physicians to adapt clinical paradigms for telemedicine applications.

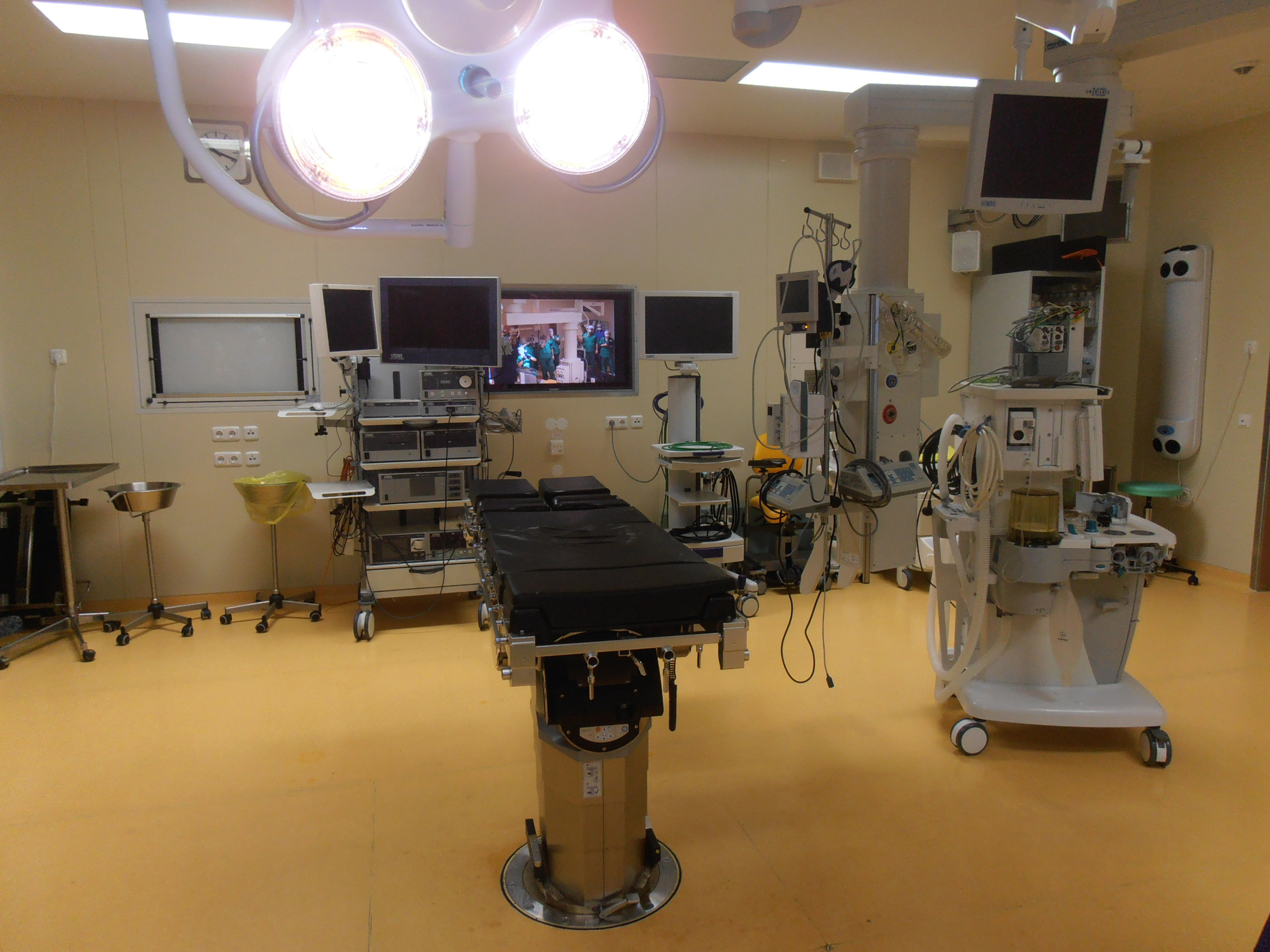
Telemedicine system. Federal Center of Neurosurgery in Tyumen (2013)

Emergency telehealth is also gaining acceptance in the United States. There are several modalities currently being practiced that include but are not limited to TeleTriage, TeleMSE, and ePPE.

An example of telehealth in the field is when Emergency Medical Services (EMS) arrive on the scene of an incident and are able to perform an electrocardiogram (EKG) that is then sent directly to a physician at the hospital to be read, allowing for prompt care and management..

=== Telenursing ===
A short video on telenursing by the Welsh Government (2016)

Telenursing refers to the use of telecommunications and information technology in order to provide nursing services in health care whenever a large physical distance exists between patient and nurse, or between any number of nurses. As a field, it is part of telehealth, and has many points of contact with other medical and non-medical applications, such as telediagnosis, teleconsultation, telemonitoring, etc.

Telenursing is achieving significant growth rates in many countries due to several factors: the preoccupation with reducing the costs of health care, an increase in the aging and chronically ill population, and the increase in coverage of health care to distant, rural, small or sparsely populated regions. Among its benefits, telenursing may help solve increasing shortages of nurses, reduce distances and travel time, and keep patients out of hospital. A greater degree of job satisfaction has been registered among telenurses.

In Australia, during January 2014, Melbourne tech startup Small World Social collaborated with the Australian Breastfeeding Association to create the first hands-free breastfeeding Google Glass application for new mothers. The application, named Google Glass Breastfeeding app trial, allows mothers to nurse their baby while viewing instructions about common breastfeeding issues (latching on, posture, etc.) or call a lactation consultant via a secure Google Hangout, who can view the issue through the mother's Google Glass camera. The trial was successfully concluded in Melbourne in April 2014, and 100% of participants were breastfeeding confidently.

=== Telepalliative care ===
Palliative care is an interdisciplinary medical caregiving approach aimed at optimizing quality of life and mitigating suffering among people with serious, complex, and often terminal illnesses. In the past, palliative care was a disease specific approach, but today the World Health Organization (WHO) takes a broader approach suggesting that palliative care should be applied as early as possible to any chronic and fatal illness. As in many aspects of health care, telehealth is increasingly being used in palliative care and is often referred to as telepalliative care. The types of technology applied in telepalliative care are typically telecommunication technologies, such as video conferencing or messaging for follow-up, or digital symptom assessments through digital questionnaires generating alerts to health care professionals. Telepalliative care has been shown to be a feasible approach to deliver palliative care among patients, caregivers and health care professionals. Telepalliative care can provide an added support system that enable patients to remain at home through self-reporting of symptoms and tailoring care to specific patients. Studies have shown that the use of telehealth in palliative care is mostly well received by patients, and that telepalliative care may improve access to health care professionals at home and enhance feelings of security and safety among patients receiving palliative care. Further, telepalliative care may enable more efficient utilization of healthcare resources, promotes collaboration between different levels of healthcare, and makes healthcare professionals more responsive to changes in patients' condition.

Challenging aspects of the use of telehealth in palliative care have also been described. Generally, palliative care is a diverse medical specialty, involving interdisciplinary professionals from different professional traditions and cultures, delivering care to a heterogenous cohort of patients with diverse diseases, conditions and symptoms. This makes it a challenge to develop telehealth that is suitable for all patients and in all contexts of palliative care. Some of the barriers to telepalliative care relate to inflexible reporting of complex and fluctuating symptoms and circumstances using electronic questionnaires. Further, palliative care emphasizes a holistic approach that should address existential, spiritual and mental distress related to serious illness. However, few studies have included the self-reporting of existential or spiritual concerns, emotions, and well-being. Healthcare professionals may also be uncomfortable providing emotional or psychological care remotely. Palliative care has been characterized as high-touch rather than high-tech, limiting the interest in applying technological advancements when developing interventions. To optimize the advantages and minimize the challenges with the use of telehealth in home-based palliative care, future research should include users in the design and development process. Understanding the potential of telehealth to support therapeutic relationships between patients and health care professionals and being aware of the possible difficulties and tensions it may create are critical to its successful and acceptable use.

=== Telepharmacy ===
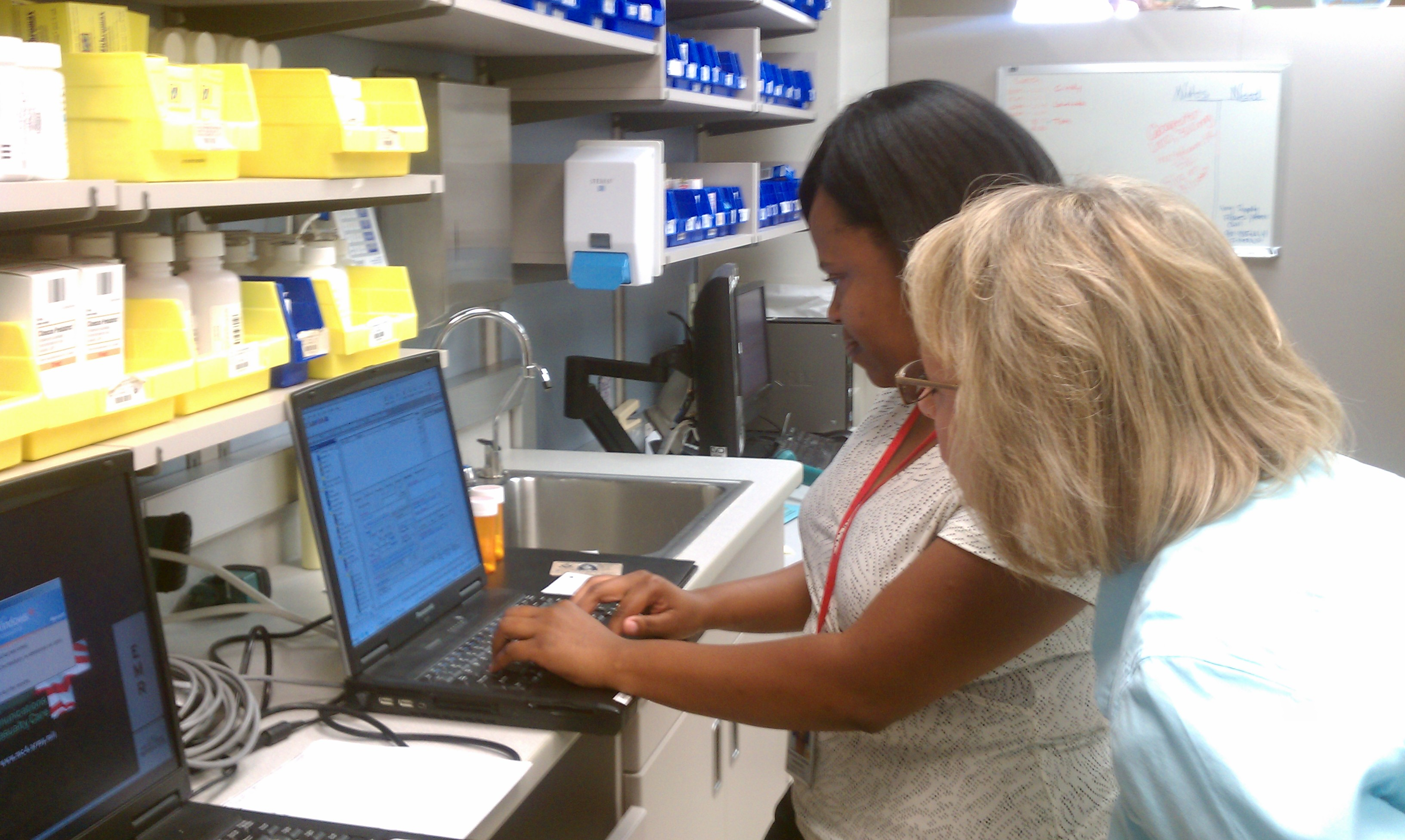
Pharmacy personnel deliver medical prescriptions electronically. Remote delivery of pharmaceutical care is an example of telemedicine.

Telepharmacy is the delivery of pharmaceutical care via telecommunications to patients in locations where they may not have direct contact with a pharmacist. It is an instance of the wider phenomenon of telemedicine, as implemented in the field of pharmacy. Telepharmacy services include drug therapy monitoring, patient counseling, prior authorization and refill authorization for prescription drugs, and monitoring of formulary compliance with the aid of teleconferencing or videoconferencing. Remote dispensing of medications by automated packaging and labeling systems can also be thought of as an instance of telepharmacy. Telepharmacy services can be delivered at retail pharmacy sites or through hospitals, nursing homes, or other medical care facilities. This approach allows patients in remote or underserved areas to receive pharmacy services that would otherwise be unavailable to them, enhancing access to care and ensuring continuity in medication management. Health outcomes appear similar when pharmacy services are delivered by telepharmacy compared to traditional service delivery.

The term can also refer to the use of videoconferencing in pharmacy for other purposes, such as providing education, training, and management services to pharmacists and pharmacy staff remotely.

=== Telepsychiatry ===
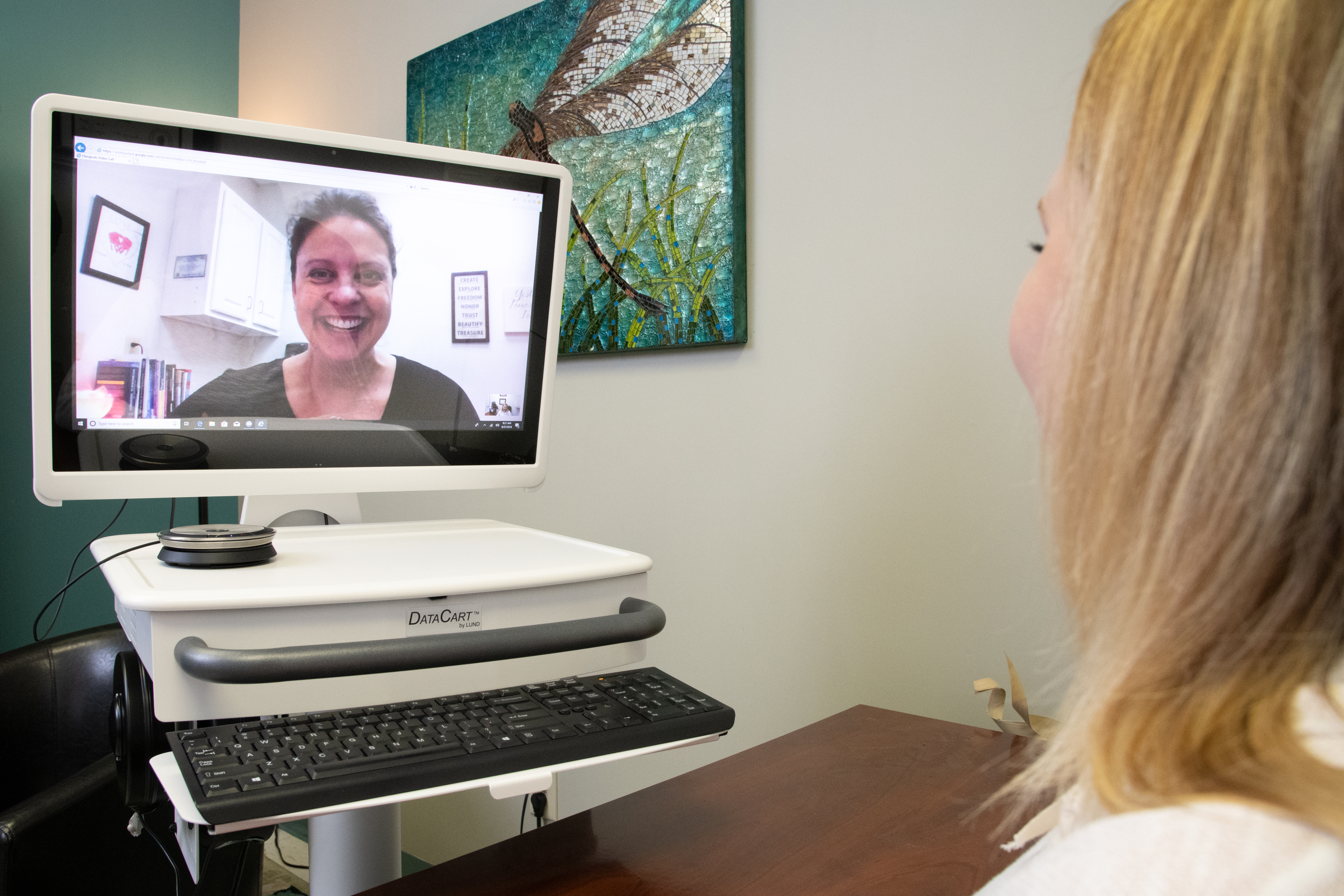
Telemental health session

Telepsychiatry or telemental health refers to the use of telecommunications technology (mostly videoconferencing and phone calls) to deliver psychiatric care remotely for people with mental health conditions. It is a branch of telemedicine.

Telepsychiatry can be effective in treating people with mental health conditions. In the short-term it can be as acceptable and effective as face-to-face care. Research also suggests comparable therapeutic factors, such as changes in problematic thinking or behaviour.

It can improve access to mental health services for some but might also represent a barrier for those lacking access to a suitable device, the internet or the necessary digital skills. Factors such as poverty that are associated with lack of internet access are also associated with greater risk of mental health problems, making digital exclusion an important problem of telemental health services.

During the COVID-19 pandemic mental health services were adapted to telemental health in high-income countries. It proved effective and acceptable for use in an emergency situation but there were concerns regarding its long-term implementation.

=== Telecare ===
Telecare is technology-based health care and social care, such as the monitoring of patient vital organs so that they may remain safe and independent in their own homes. Devices may include health and fitness apps, such as exercise tracking tools and digital medication reminder apps, or technologies that issue early warning and detection. The use of sensors may be part of a package which can provide support for people with illnesses such as dementia, or people at risk of falling.

Most telecare mitigates harm by reacting to untoward events and raising a help response quickly. Some telecare, such as safety confirmation and lifestyle monitoring have a preventive function in that a deterioration in the telecare user's wellbeing can be spotted at an early stage.

=== Teledentistry ===
Teledentistry is the use of information technology and telecommunications for dental care, consultation, education, and public awareness in the same manner as telehealth and telemedicine.

=== Teleaudiology ===
Tele-audiology (or teleaudiology) is the utilization of telehealth to provide audiological services and may include the full scope of audiological practice. This term was first used by Gregg Givens in 1999 in reference to a system being developed at East Carolina University in North Carolina, US.

=== Teleneurotherapy ===
Teleneurotherapy uses computers and communications technology to deliver neurotherapy remotely. Organisms receive physical stimuli, such as sounds (through mechanoreceptors and mitochondria across different organ systems) and light (through photoreceptors located in the retina and mitochondria) that alter neuronal activity in specific brain zones. Research indicates that systematic physical stimuli produced by standard electronic devices, such as tablets with headphones, may treat online injured nervous systems by modulating neuronal plasticity. Evidence suggests that teleneurotherapy may elevate neurological treatment if it considers the treating effect of a systematic abiotic impact of physical forces with key parameters of the mother-fetus interaction. Recent research implemented the APIN method (see above) in the online treatment of patients with different neurological conditions, which showed therapeutic effects.

A review of the scientific literature has shown that measurable neuronal structural changes due to neuroplasticity through teleneurotherapy can appear within 2-3 months of such systematic impacts. The systematic effect of cognitive load from computer work, with a total training duration of 16 h (a few hours of weekly exercise), can significantly affect brain structure and function.

=== Teleneurology ===
Teleneurology describes the use of mobile technology to provide neurological care remotely, including care for stroke, movement disorders like Parkinson's disease, seizure disorders (e.g., epilepsy), etc. The term teleneurology implies remote education, diagnostic assistance, and consultation, while it does not involve non-invasive remote targeted delivery of an energy stimulus to a specific neurological zone in the body to alter neuronal activity. The use of teleneurology gives us the opportunity to improve health care access for billions around the globe, from those living in urban locations to those in remote, rural locations. Evidence shows that individuals with Parkinson's disease prefer personal connection with a remote specialist to their local clinician. Such home care is convenient but requires access to and familiarity with the Internet. A 2017 randomized controlled trial of "virtual house calls" or video visits with individuals diagnosed with Parkinson's disease evidences patient preference for the remote specialist vs their local clinician after one year. Teleneurology for patients with Parkison's disease is found to be cheaper than in person visits by reducing transportation and travel time A recent systematic review by Ray Dorsey et al. describes both the limitations and potential benefits of teleneurology in improving care for patients with chronic neurological conditions, especially in low-income countries. White, well-educated and technologically savvy people are the biggest consumers of telehealth services for Parkinson's disease. as compared to ethnic minorities in the US.

=== Teleneurosurgery ===
Telemedicine in neurosurgery was historically primarily used for follow-up visits by patients who had to travel far to undergo surgery. In the last decade, telemedicine was also used for remote ICU rounding as well as prompt evaluation for acute ischemic stroke and administration of IV alteplase in conjunction with neurology. From the onset of the COVID-19 pandemic, there was a rapid surge in the use of telemedicine across all divisions of neurosurgery: vascular, oncology, spine, and functional neurosurgery. Not only for follow-up visits, but it has gained popularity for seeing new patients or following established patients regardless of whether they underwent surgery. Telemedicine is not limited to direct patient care only; there are a number of new research groups and companies focused on using telemedicine for clinical trials involving patients with neurosurgical diagnoses.

=== Teleneuropsychology ===
Teleneuropsychology is the use of telehealth/videoconference technology for the remote administration of neuropsychological tests. Neuropsychological tests are used to evaluate the cognitive status of individuals with known or suspected brain disorders and provide a profile of cognitive strengths and weaknesses. Through a series of studies, there is growing support in the literature showing that remote videoconference-based administration of many standard neuropsychological tests results in test findings similar to traditional in-person evaluations, thereby establishing the basis for the reliability and validity of teleneuropsychological assessment.

=== Telenutrition ===
Telenutrition refers to the use of video conferencing/ telephony to provide online consultation by a nutritionist or dietician. Patient or clients upload their vital statistics, diet logs, food pictures, etc., on a telenutrition portal that is then used by the nutritionist or dietician to analyze their current health condition. The nutritionist or dietician can then set goals for their respective clients/patients and monitor their progress regularly by follow-up consultations.

Telenutrition portals can help people seek remote consultation for themselves and/or their family. This can be extremely helpful for elderly or bedridden patients who can consult their dietician from comfort of their homes.

Telenutrition showed to be feasible, and the majority of patients trusted the nutritional televisits, in place of the scheduled but not provided follow-up visits during the lockdown of the COVID-19 pandemic.

=== Telerehabilitation ===
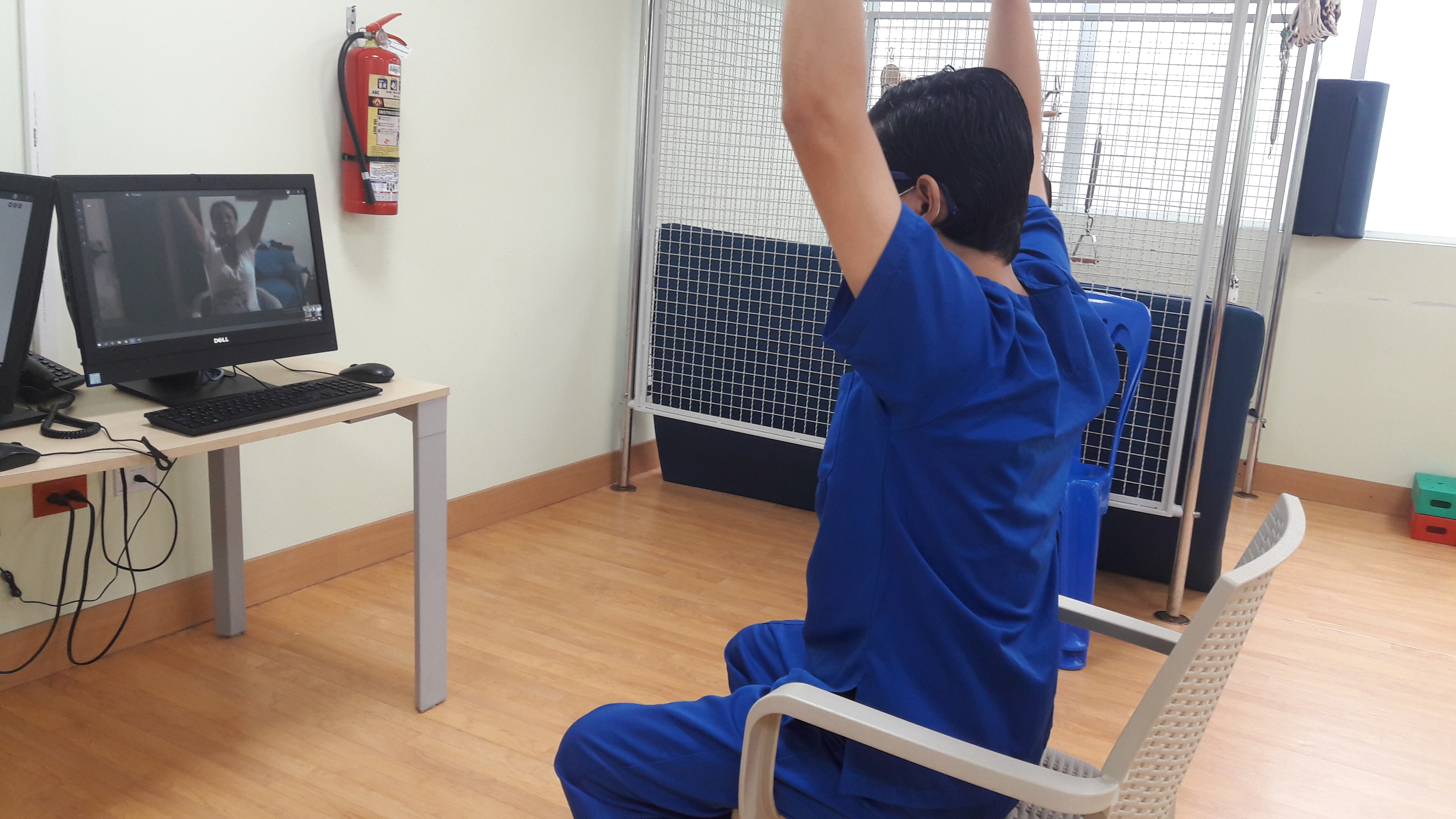
Telemedicine in rehabilitation

Telerehabilitation (or e-rehabilitation) is the delivery of rehabilitation services over telecommunication networks and the Internet. Most types of services fall into two categories: clinical assessment (the patient's functional abilities in his or her environment) and clinical therapy. Some fields of rehabilitation practice that have explored telerehabilitation are: neuropsychology, speech–language pathology, audiology, occupational therapy, and physical therapy. Telerehabilitation can deliver therapy to people who cannot travel to a clinic because the patient has a disability or because of travel time. Telerehabilitation also allows experts in rehabilitation to engage in clinical consultation at a distance.

Most telerehabilitation is highly visual. As of 2014, the most commonly used mediums are webcams, videoconferencing, phone lines, videophones, and webpages containing rich web applications. The visual nature of telerehabilitation technology limits the types of rehabilitation services that can be provided. It is most widely used for neuropsychological rehabilitation, fitting of rehabilitation equipment such as wheelchairs, braces, or artificial limbs, and in speech-language pathology. Rich web applications for neuropsychological rehabilitation (cognitive rehabilitation) of cognitive impairment (from many etiologies) were first introduced in 2001. This endeavor has expanded as a teletherapy application for cognitive skills enhancement programs for school children. Tele-audiology (hearing assessments) is a growing application. Physical therapy and psychology interventions delivered via telehealth may result in similar outcomes as those delivered in person for a range of health conditions.

Two important areas of telerehabilitation research are (1) demonstrating equivalence of assessment and therapy to in-person assessment and therapy and (2) building new data collection systems to digitize information that a therapist can use in practice. Ground-breaking research in telehaptics (the sense of touch) and virtual reality may broaden the scope of telerehabilitation practice in the future.

In the United States, the National Institute on Disability and Rehabilitation Research's (NIDRR) supports research and the development of telerehabilitation. NIDRR's grantees include the "Rehabilitation Engineering and Research Center" (RERC) at the University of Pittsburgh, the Rehabilitation Institute of Chicago, the State University of New York at Buffalo, and the National Rehabilitation Hospital in Washington, D.C. Other federal funders of research are the Veterans Health Administration, the Health Services Research Administration in the US Department of Health and Human Services, and the Department of Defense. Outside the United States, excellent research is conducted in Australia and Europe.

Only a few health insurers in the United States, and about half of Medicaid programs, reimburse for telerehabilitation services. If the research shows that teleassessments and teletherapy are equivalent to clinical encounters, it is more likely that insurers and Medicare will cover telerehabilitation services.

=== Teletrauma care ===
Telemedicine can be utilized to improve the efficiency and effectiveness of care delivery in a trauma environment. Examples include:

Telemedicine for trauma triage: using telemedicine, trauma specialists can interact with personnel on the scene of a mass casualty or disaster situation via the internet using mobile devices to determine the severity of injuries. They can provide clinical assessments and determine whether those injured must be evacuated for necessary care. Remote trauma specialists can provide the same quality of clinical assessment and plan of care as a trauma specialist located physically with the patient.

Telemedicine for intensive care unit (ICU) rounds: Telemedicine is also being used in some trauma ICUs to reduce the spread of infections. Rounds are usually conducted at hospitals across the country by a team of approximately ten or more people including attending physicians, fellows, residents, and other clinicians. This group usually moves from bed to bed in a unit, discussing each patient. This aids in the transition of care for patients from the night shift to the morning shift but also serves as an educational experience for new residents to the team. A new approach features the team conducting rounds from a conference room using a video-conferencing system. The trauma attending, residents, fellows, nurses, nurse practitioners, and pharmacists are able to watch a live video stream from the patient's bedside. They can see the vital signs on the monitor, view the settings on the respiratory ventilator, and/or view the patient's wounds. Video-conferencing allows remote viewers to conduct two-way communication with clinicians at the bedside.

Telemedicine for trauma education: some trauma centers are delivering trauma education lectures to hospitals and health care providers worldwide using video conferencing technology. Each lecture provides fundamental principles, first-hand knowledge, and evidenced-based methods for critical analysis of established clinical practice standards, and comparisons to newer advanced alternatives. The various sites collaborate and share their perspective based on location, available staff, and available resources.

Telemedicine in the trauma operating room: trauma surgeons are able to observe and consult on cases from a remote location using video conferencing. This capability allows the attending to view the residents in real time. The remote surgeon has the capability to control the camera (pan, tilt, and zoom) to get the best angle of the procedure while at the same time providing expertise in order to provide the best possible care to the patient.

=== Telecardiology ===
ECGs, or electrocardiographs, can be transmitted using telephone and wireless. Willem Einthoven, the inventor of the ECG, actually did tests with the transmission of ECG via telephone lines. This was because the hospital did not allow him to move patients outside the hospital to his laboratory for testing of his new device. In 1906, Einthoven came up with a way to transmit the data from the hospital directly to his lab.

==== Transmission of ECGs ====
One of the oldest known telecardiology systems for teletransmissions of ECGs was established in Gwalior, India, in 1975 at GR Medical College by Ajai Shanker, S. Makhija, P.K. Mantri using an indigenous technique for the first time in India.

This system enabled wireless transmission of ECG from the moving ICU van or the patients home to the central station in ICU of the department of Medicine. Transmission using wireless was done using frequency modulation which eliminated noise. Transmission was also done through telephone lines. The ECG output was connected to the telephone input using a modulator that converted ECG into high-frequency sound. At the other end a demodulator reconverted the sound into ECG with a good gain accuracy. The ECG was converted to sound waves with a frequency varying from 500 Hz to 2500 Hz with 1500 Hz at baseline.

This system was also used to monitor patients with pacemakers in remote areas. The central control unit at the ICU was able to correctly interpret arrhythmia. This technique helped medical aid reach in remote areas.

In addition, electronic stethoscopes can be used as recording devices, which is helpful for purposes of telecardiology. There are many examples of successful telecardiology services worldwide.

In Pakistan, three pilot projects in telemedicine were initiated by the Ministry of IT & Telecom, Government of Pakistan (MoIT) through the Electronic Government Directorate in collaboration with Oratier Technologies (a pioneer company within Pakistan dealing with healthcare and HMIS) and PakDataCom (a bandwidth provider). Three hub stations through were linked via the Pak Sat-I communications satellite, and four districts were linked with another hub. A 312 Kb link was also established with remote sites and 1 Mbit/s bandwidth was provided at each hub. Three hubs were established: the Mayo Hospital (the largest hospital in Asia), JPMC Karachi, and Holy Family Rawalpindi. These 12 remote sites were connected and an average of 1,500 patients were treated per month per hub. The project was still running smoothly after two years.

Wireless ambulatory ECG technology, moving beyond previous ambulatory ECG technology such as the Holter monitor, now includes smartphones and Apple Watches, which can perform at-home cardiac monitoring and send the data to a physician via the Internet.

=== Teleradiology ===
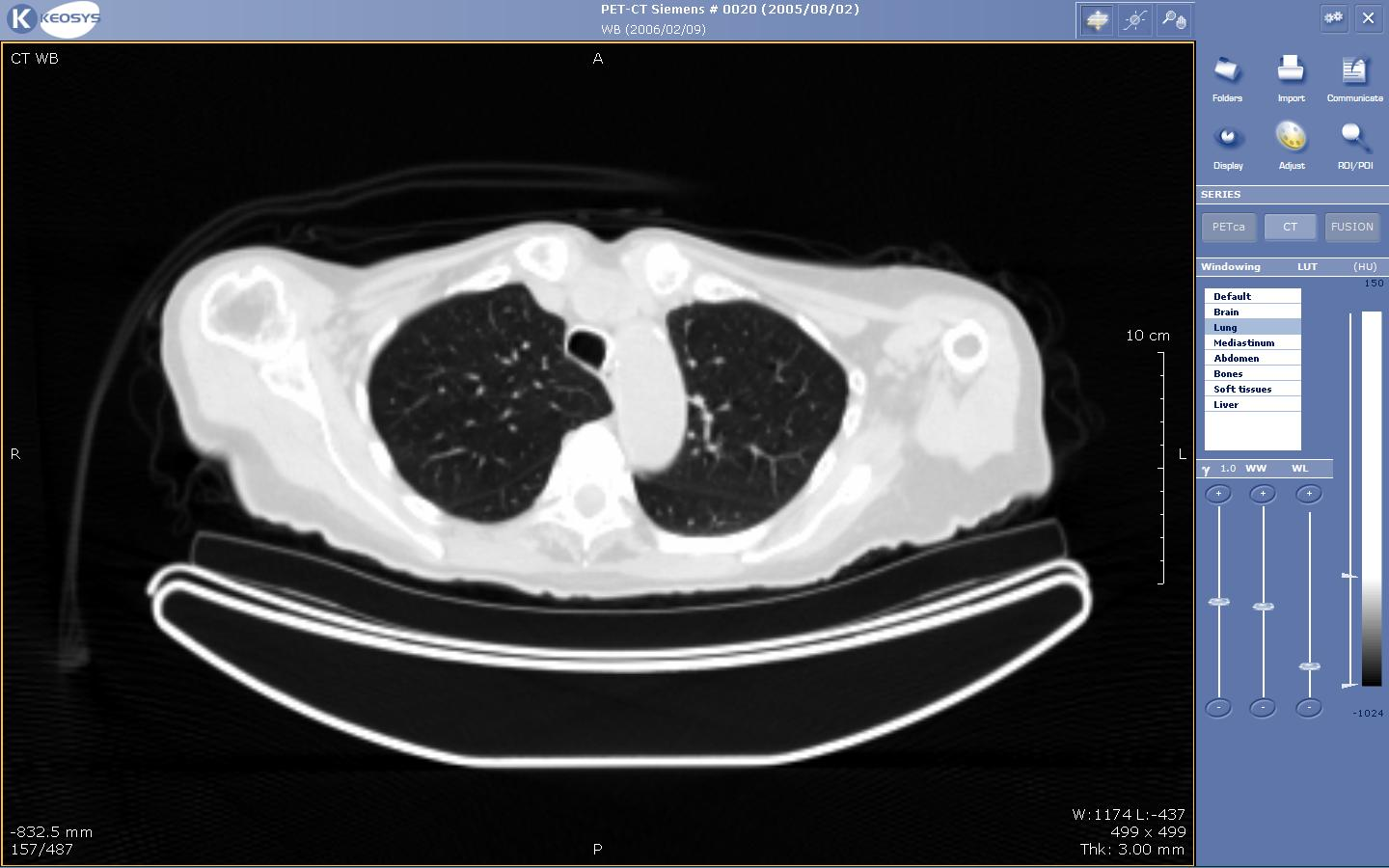
A CT exam displayed through teleradiology

Teleradiology is the ability to send radiographic images (X-rays, CT, MR, PET/CT, SPECT/CT, MG, US...) from one location to another. For this process to be implemented, three essential components are required: an image-sending station, a transmission network, and a receiving-image review station. The most typical implementation is two computers connected via the Internet. The computer at the receiving end will need a high-quality display screen that has been tested and cleared for clinical purposes. Sometimes the receiving computer will have a printer for convenience.

The teleradiology process begins at the image-sending station. The radiographic image and a modem or other connection are required for this first step. The image is scanned and then sent via the network connection to the receiving computer.

Today's high-speed broadband-based Internet enables the use of new technologies for teleradiology: the image reviewer can now have access to distant servers in order to view an exam. Therefore, they do not need particular workstations to view the images; a standard personal computer (PC) and digital subscriber line (DSL) connection is enough to reach Keosys' central server. No particular software is necessary on the PC, and the images can be reached from anywhere in the world.

Teleradiology is the most popular use for telemedicine and accounts for at least 50% of all telemedicine usage.

=== Telepathology ===
Telepathology is the practice of pathology at a distance. It uses telecommunications technology to facilitate the transfer of image-rich pathology data between distant locations for the purposes of diagnosis, education, and research. The performance of telepathology requires that a pathologist selects the video images for analysis and rendering diagnoses. The use of "television microscopy", the forerunner of telepathology, did not require that a pathologist have physical or virtual "hands-on" involvement in the selection of microscopic fields of view for analysis and diagnosis.

A pathologist, Ronald S. Weinstein, M.D., coined the term "telepathology" in 1986. In an editorial in a medical journal, Weinstein outlined the actions that would be needed to create remote pathology diagnostic services. He and his collaborators published the first scientific paper on robotic telepathology. Weinstein was also granted the first U.S. patents for robotic telepathology systems and telepathology diagnostic networks. Weinstein is known to many as the "father of telepathology". In Norway, Eide and Nordrum implemented the first sustainable clinical telepathology service in 1989. This is still in operation, decades later. A number of clinical telepathology services have benefited many thousands of patients in North America, Europe, and Asia.

Telepathology has been successfully used for many applications, including the rendering histopathology tissue diagnoses at a distance, for education and research. Although digital pathology imaging, including virtual microscopy, is the mode of choice for telepathology services in developed countries, analog telepathology imaging is still used for patient services in some developing countries.

=== Teledermatology ===
Teledermatology allows dermatology consultations over a distance using audio, visual and data communication, and has been found to improve efficiency, access to specialty care, and patient satisfaction. Applications comprise health care management such as diagnoses, consultation and treatment as well as (continuing medical) education. The dermatologists Perednia and Brown were the first to coin the term teledermatology in 1995, where they described the value of a teledermatologic service in a rural area underserved by dermatologists.

=== Teleophthalmology ===
Teleophthalmology is a branch of telemedicine that delivers eye care through digital medical equipment and telecommunications technology. Today, applications of teleophthalmology encompass access to eye specialists for patients in remote areas, ophthalmic disease screening, diagnosis and monitoring; as well as distant learning. Teleophthalmology may help reduce disparities by providing remote, low-cost screening tests such as diabetic retinopathy screening to low-income and uninsured patients. In Mizoram, India, a hilly area with poor roads, between 2011 and 2015, teleophthalmology provided care to over 10,000 patients. These patients were examined by ophthalmic assistants locally but surgery was done on appointment after the patient images were viewed online by eye surgeons in the hospital 6–12 hours away. Instead of an average five trips for say, a cataract procedure, only one was required for surgery alone as even post-op care like removal of stitches and appointments for glasses was done locally. There were large cost savings in travel as well.

In the United States, some companies allow patients to complete an online visual exam and within 24 hours receive a prescription from an optometrist valid for eyeglasses, contact lenses, or both. Some US states such as Indiana have attempted to ban these companies from doing business.

=== Telesurgery ===
Remote surgery (also known as telesurgery) is the ability for a doctor to perform surgery on a patient even though they are not physically in the same location. It is a form of telepresence. Remote surgery combines elements of robotics, cutting-edge telecommunications such as high-speed data connections, telehaptics and elements of management information systems. While the field of robotic surgery is fairly well established, most of these robots are controlled by surgeons at the location of the surgery.

Remote surgery is remote work for surgeons, where the physical distance between the surgeon and the patient is immaterial. It promises to allow the expertise of specialized surgeons to be available to patients worldwide, without the need for patients to travel beyond their local hospital.

Remote surgery or telesurgery is performance of surgical procedures where the surgeon is not physically in the same location as the patient, using a robotic teleoperator system controlled by the surgeon. The remote operator may give tactile feedback to the user. Remote surgery combines elements of robotics and high-speed data connections. A critical limiting factor is the speed, latency and reliability of the communication system between the surgeon and the patient, though trans-Atlantic surgeries have been demonstrated.

=== Teleabortion ===
Telemedicine has been used globally to increase access to abortion care, specifically medical abortion, in environments where few abortion care providers exist or abortion is legally restricted. Clinicians are able to virtually provide counseling, review screening tests, observe the administration of an abortion medication, and directly mail abortion pills to people. In 2004, Women on Web (WoW), Amsterdam, started offering online consultations, mostly to people living in areas where abortion was legally restricted, informing them how to safely use medical abortion drugs to end a pregnancy. People contact the Women on Web service online; physicians review any necessary lab results or ultrasounds, mail mifepristone and misoprostol pills to people, then follow up through online communication. In the United States, medical abortion was introduced as a telehealth service in Iowa by Planned Parenthood of the Heartland in 2008 to allow a patient at one health facility to communicate via secure video with a health provider at another facility. In this model a person seeking abortion care must come to a health facility. An abortion care provider communicates with the person located at another site using clinic-to-clinic videoconferencing to provide medical abortion after screening tests and consultation with clinic staff. In 2018, the website Aid Access was launched by the founder of Women on Web, Rebecca Gomperts. It offers a similar service as Women on Web in the United States, but the medications are prescribed to an Indian pharmacy, then mailed to the United States.

The TelAbortion study conducted by Gynuity Health Projects, with special approval from the U.S. Food and Drug Administration (FDA), aims to increase access to medical abortion care without requiring an in-person visit to a clinic. This models was expanded during the COVID-19 pandemic and as of March 2020 exists in 13 U.S. states and has enrolled over 730 people in the study. The person receives counseling and instruction from an abortion care provider via videoconference from a location of their choice. The medications necessary for the abortion, mifepristone and misoprostol, are mailed directly to the person and they have a follow-up video consultation in 7–14 days. A systematic review of telemedicine abortion has found the practice to be safe, effective, efficient, and satisfactory.

In the United States, eighteen states require the clinician to be physically present during the administration of medications for abortion which effectively bans telehealth of medication abortion: five states explicitly ban telemedicine for medication abortion, while thirteen states require the prescriber (usually required to be a physician) to be physically present with the patient. In the UK, the Royal College of Obstetricians and Gynecologists approved a no-test protocol for medication abortion, with mifepristone available through a minimal-contact pick-up or by mail.

=== Other specialist care delivery ===
Telemedicine can facilitate specialty care delivered by primary care physicians according to a controlled study of the treatment of hepatitis C. Various specialties are contributing to telemedicine, in varying degrees.Other specialist conditions for which telemedicine has been used include perinatal mental health.

In light of the COVID-19 pandemic, primary care physicians have relied on telehealth to continue to provide care in outpatient settings. The transition to virtual health has been beneficial in providing patients access to care (especially care that does not require a physical exam e.g. medication changes, minor health updates) and avoid putting patients at risk of COVID-19. This included providing services to pediatric patients during the pandemic, where issues of last minute cancelation and rescheduling were frequently related to a lack of technicality and engagement, two factors often understudied in the literature.

Telemedicine has also been beneficial in facilitating medical education to students while still allowing for adequate social distancing during the COVID-19 pandemic. Many medical schools have shifted to alternate forms of virtual curriculum and are still able to engage in meaningful telehealth encounters with patients.

Medication assisted treatment (MAT) is the treatment of opioid use disorder (OUD) with medications, often in combination with behavioral therapy As a response to the COVID-19 pandemic the use of telemedicine has been granted by the Drug Enforcement Administration to start or maintain people OUD on buprenorphine (trade name Suboxone) via telemedicine without the need for an initial in-person examination. On March 31, 2020, QuickMD became the first national TeleMAT service in the United States to provide Medication-assisted Treatment with Suboxone online – without the need of an in-person visit; with others announcing to follow soon.

== Major developments ==
=== In policy ===
Telehealth is a modern form of health care delivery. Telehealth breaks away from traditional health care delivery by using modern telecommunication systems including wireless communication methods. Traditional health is legislated through policy to ensure the safety of medical practitioners and patients. Consequently, since telehealth is a new form of health care delivery that is now gathering momentum in the health sector, many organizations have started to legislate the use of telehealth into policy. In New Zealand, the Medical Council has a statement about telehealth on their website. This illustrates that the medical council has foreseen the importance that telehealth will have on the health system and have started to introduce telehealth legislation to practitioners along with government.

=== Transition to mainstream ===
Traditional use of telehealth services has been for specialist treatment. However, there has been a paradigm shift and telehealth is no longer considered a specialist service. This development has ensured that many access barriers are eliminated, as medical professionals and patients are able to use wireless communication technologies to deliver health care. This is evident in rural communities. Rural residents typically have to travel to longer distances to access healthcare than urban counterparts due to physician shortages and healthcare facility closures in these areas. Telehealth eliminates this barrier as health professionals are able to conduct medical consultations through the use of wireless communication technologies. However, this process is dependent on both parties having internet access and comfort level with technology, which poses barriers for many low-income and rural communities.

Telehealth allows the patient to be monitored between physician office visits which can improve patient health. Telehealth also allows patients to access expertise which is not available in their local area. This remote patient monitoring ability enables patients to stay at home longer and helps avoid unnecessary hospital time. In the long-term, this could potentially result in less burdening of the healthcare system and consumption of resources.

During the COVID-19 pandemic, there were large increases in the use of telemedicine for primary care visits within the United States, increasing from an average of 1.4 million visits in Q2 of 2018 and 2019 to 35 million visits in Q2 2020, according to data from IQVIA. The telehealth market is expected to grow at 40% a year in 2021. Use of telemedicine by General Practitioners in the UK rose from 20 to 30% pre-COVID to almost 80% by the beginning of 2021. More than 70% of practitioners and patients were satisfied with this. Boris Johnson was said to have "piled pressure on GPs to offer more in-person consultations" supporting a campaign largely orchestrated by the Daily Mail. The Royal College of General Practitioners said that a patient "right" to have face-to-face appointments if they wish was "undeliverable".

=== Technology advancement ===
The technological advancement of wireless communication devices is a major development in telehealth. This allows patients to self-monitor their health conditions and to not rely as much on health care professionals. Furthermore, patients are more willing to stay on their treatment plans as they are more invested and included in the process as the decision-making is shared. Technological advancement also means that health care professionals are able to use better technologies to treat patients for example in maternal care and surgery. A 2023 study published in the Journal of the American College of Surgeons showed telemedicine as making a positive impact, with expectations exceeded for those physicians and patients who had consulted online for surgeries. Technological developments in telehealth are essential to improve health care, especially the delivery of healthcare services, as resources are finite along with an ageing population that is living longer.

== Licensing ==
=== U.S. licensing and regulatory issues ===
Restrictive licensure laws in the United States require a practitioner to obtain a full license to deliver telemedicine care across state lines. Typically, states with restrictive licensure laws also have several exceptions (varying from state to state) that may release an out-of-state practitioner from the additional burden of obtaining such a license. A number of states require practitioners who seek compensation to frequently deliver interstate care to acquire a full license.

If a practitioner serves several states, obtaining this license in each state could be an expensive and time-consuming proposition. Even if the practitioner never practices medicine face-to-face with a patient in another state, he/she still must meet a variety of other individual state requirements, including paying substantial licensure fees, passing additional oral and written examinations, and traveling for interviews.

In 2008, the U.S. passed the Ryan Haight Act which required face-to-face or valid telemedicine consultations prior to receiving a prescription.

State medical licensing boards have sometimes opposed telemedicine; for example, in 2012 electronic consultations were illegal in Idaho, and an Idaho-licensed general practitioner was punished by the board for prescribing an antibiotic, triggering reviews of her licensure and board certifications across the country. Subsequently, in 2015 the state legislature legalized electronic consultations.

In 2015, Teladoc filed suit against the Texas Medical Board over a rule that required in-person consultations initially; the judge refused to dismiss the case, noting that antitrust laws apply to state medical boards.

=== EU licensing and regulatory issues ===
In the European Union, telemedicine service providers are primarily subject to the regulatory requirements that apply at their place of establishment (country of origin principle).

== Major implications and impacts ==
Telehealth allows multiple, varying disciplines to merge and deliver a potentially more uniform level of care, using technology. As telehealth proliferates mainstream healthcare, it challenges notions of traditional healthcare delivery. Some populations experience better quality, access and more personalized health care.

=== Health promotion ===
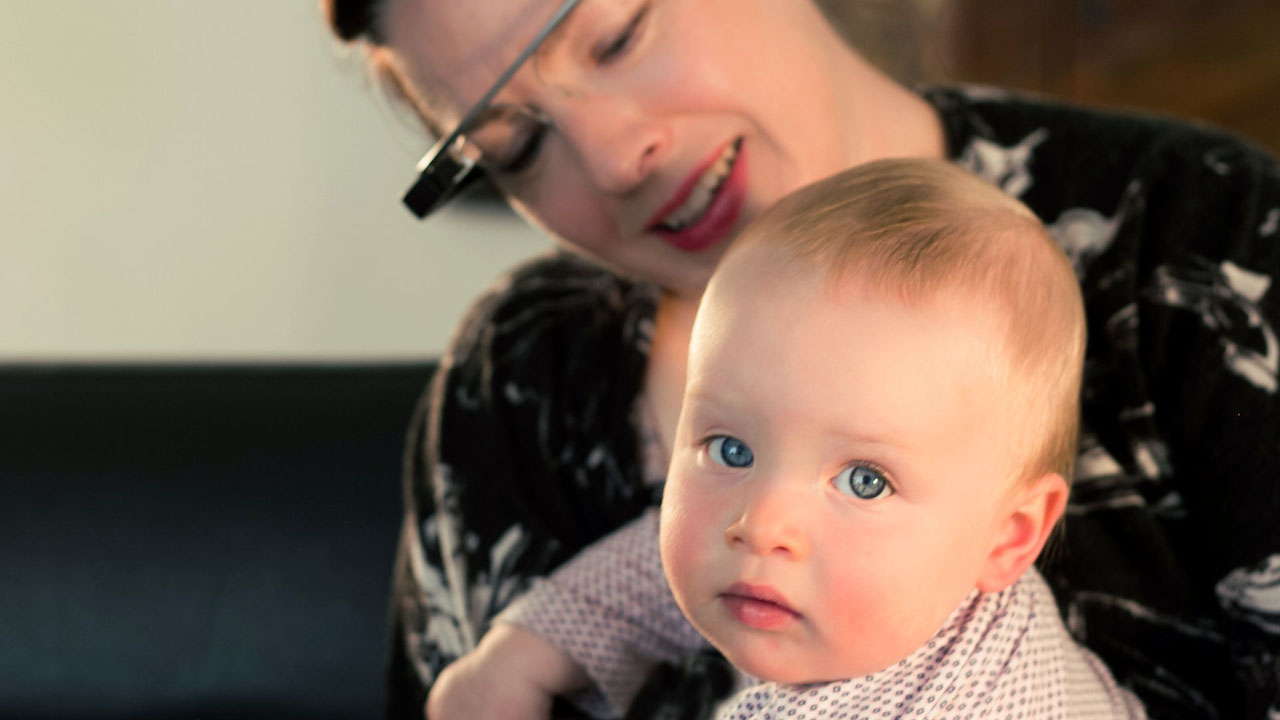
Baby Eve with Georgia for the Breastfeeding Support Project

Telehealth can also increase health promotion efforts. These efforts can now be more personalised to the target population and professionals can extend their help into homes or private and safe environments in which patients of individuals can practice, ask and gain health information. Health promotion using telehealth has become increasingly popular in underdeveloped countries where there are very poor physical resources available. There has been a particular push toward mHealth applications as many areas, even underdeveloped ones have mobile phone and smartphone coverage.

In a 2015 article reviewing research on the use of a mobile health application in the United Kingdom, authors describe how a home-based application helped patients manage and monitor their health and symptoms independently. The mobile health application allows people to rapidly self-report their symptoms – 95% of patients were able to report their daily symptoms in less than 100 seconds, which is less than the 5 minutes (plus commuting) taken to measure vital signs by nurses in hospitals. Online applications allow patients to remain at home to keep track of the progression of their chronic illnesses. The downside of using mHealth applications is that not everyone, especially in developing countries, has daily access to internet or electronic devices.

In developed countries, health promotion efforts using telehealth have been met with some success. The Australian hands-free breastfeeding Google Glass application reported promising results in 2014. This application made in collaboration with the Australian Breastfeeding Association and a tech startup called Small World Social, helped new mothers learn how to breastfeed. Breastfeeding is beneficial to infant health and maternal health and is recommended by the World Health Organisation and health organisations all over the world. Widespread breastfeeding can prevent 820,000 infant deaths globally but the practice is often stopped prematurely or intents to do are disrupted due to lack of social support, know-how or other factors. This application gave mother's hands-free information on breastfeeding, instructions on how to breastfeed and also had an option to call a lactation consultant over Google Hangout. When the trial ended, all participants were reported to be confident in breastfeeding.

=== Health care quality and barriers to adoption ===
A scientific review indicates that, in general, outcomes of telemedicine are or can be as good as in-person care with health care use staying similar.

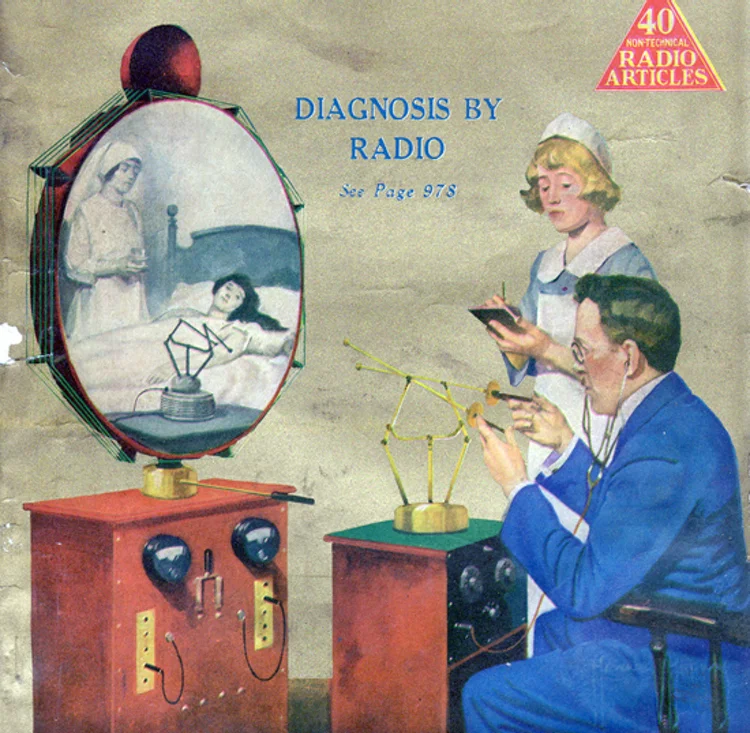
Telemedicine as predicted in 1925

Advantages of the nonexclusive adoption of already existing telemedicine technologies such as smartphone videotelephony may include reduced infection risks, increased control of disease during epidemic conditions, improved access to care, reduced stress and exposure to other pathogens during illness for better recovery, reduced time and labor costs, efficient more accessible matching of patients with particular symptoms and clinicians who are experts for such, and reduced travel while disadvantages may include privacy breaches (e.g. due to software backdoors and vulnerabilities or sale of data), dependability on Internet access and, depending on various factors, increased health care use.

Theoretically, the whole health system could benefit from telehealth. There are indications telehealth consumes fewer resources and requires fewer people to operate it with shorter training periods to implement initiatives. Commenters suggested that lawmakers may fear that making telehealth widely accessible, without any other measures, would lead to patients using unnecessary health care services. Telemedicine could also be used for connected networks between health care professionals.

Telemedicine also can eliminate the possible transmission of infectious diseases or parasites between patients and medical staff. This is particularly an issue where MRSA is a concern. Additionally, some patients who feel uncomfortable in a doctors office may do better remotely. For example, white coat syndrome may be avoided. Patients who are home-bound and would otherwise require an ambulance to move them to a clinic are also a consideration.

However, whether or not the standard of health care quality is increasing is debatable, with some literature refuting such claims. Research has reported that clinicians find the process difficult and complex to deal with. Furthermore, there are concerns around informed consent, legality issues as well as legislative issues. A recent study also highlighted that the swift and large-scale implementation of telehealth across the United Kingdom NHS Allied Health Professional (AHP) services might increase disparities in health care access for vulnerable populations with limited digital literacy. Although health care may become affordable with the help of technology, whether or not this care will be "good" is the issue. Many studies indicate high satisfaction with telemedicine among patients. Among the factors associated with a good trust in telemedicine, the use of known and user-friendly video services and confidence in the data protection policies were the two variables contributing most to trust in telemedicine.

Public health practitioners also face broader challenges in scaling telehealth services, including limited digital skills among certain patient groups, variability in technology access, concerns around data privacy, and the difficulty of integrating remote-care workflows into existing health systems.

Major problems with increasing adoption include technically challenged staff, resistance to change or habits and age of patient. Focused policy could eliminate several barriers.

A review lists a number of potentially good practices and pitfalls, recommending the use of "virtual handshakes" for confirming identity, taking consent for conducting remote consultation over a conventional meeting, and professional standardized norms for protecting patient privacy and confidentiality. It also found that the COVID-19 pandemic substantially increased, voluntarily, the adoption of telephone or video consultation and suggests that telemedicine technology "is a key factor in delivery of health care in the future".

=== Geriatric population ===
Technologies' growing involvement in health care has led to continuous improvement in access, efficiency and quality of care, but numerous challenges lie with addressing the barriers that impair the geriatric population from benefitting from the use of this new technology. With the COVID-19 pandemic, rapid implementation of telehealth in geriatric outpatient clinics occurred. Although time efficiency greatly improved and increased access to geriatric patients with lack of transportation to the clinic, there were complications that arose during and after implementation with many appointments requiring rescheduling due to language barrier, poor connection, hard of hearing, or inability to perform assessments. Studies also show that patients and their family member often preferred in-person visits. Even though patients were able to meet with a provider sooner and had access to high-quality audio and video as well as family participation during visits, patients and family noted preferences for in-person visits due to the difficulty in using the service. Improvements are being made to help ease the complications of telehealth for geriatric patients. These include integrated captions on video calls for the hearing impaired, virtual interpreters that will attend the calls for language differences, government assisted internet services, and increased training to medical providers and patients on telehealth use.

=== Economic evaluations ===
Due to its digital nature, it is often assumed that telehealth saves the health system money. However, the evidence to support this is varied. When conducting economic evaluations of telehealth services, the individuals evaluating them need to be aware of potential outcomes and extraclinical benefits of the telehealth service. Economic viability relies on the funding model within the country being examined (public vs private), the consumers willingness-to-pay, and the expected remuneration by the clinicians or commercial entities providing the services (examples of research on these topics from teledermoscopy in Australia)

In a UK telehealth trial done in 2011, it was reported that the cost of health could be dramatically reduced with the use of telehealth monitoring. The usual cost of in vitro fertilisation (IVF) per cycle would be around $15,000; with telehealth it was reduced to $800 per patient. In Alaska the Federal Health Care Access Network, which connects 3,000 healthcare providers to communities, engaged in 160,000 telehealth consultations from 2001 and saved the state $8.5 million in travel costs for just Medicaid patients.

Digital interventions for mental health conditions seem to be cost-effective compared to no intervention or non-therapeutic responses such as monitoring. However, when compared to in-person therapy or medication their added value is currently uncertain.

=== Beneficial enablements ===
Telemedicine can be beneficial to patients in isolated communities and remote regions, who can receive care from doctors or specialists far away without the patient having to travel to visit them. Recent developments in mobile collaboration technology can allow healthcare professionals in multiple locations to share information and discuss patient issues as if they were in the same place. Remote patient monitoring through mobile technology can reduce the need for outpatient visits and enable remote prescription verification and drug administration oversight, potentially significantly reducing the overall cost of medical care. It may also be preferable for patients with limited mobility, for example, patients with Parkinson's disease. Telemedicine can also facilitate medical education by allowing workers to observe experts in their fields and share best practices more easily.

==== During war and disasters ====
Remote surgery and types of videoconferencing for sharing expertise (e.g. ad hoc assistance) have been and could be used to support doctors in Ukraine during the 2022 Russian invasion of Ukraine.

==== Nonclinical uses ====
- Distance education including continuing medical education, grand rounds, and patient education
- administrative uses including meetings among telehealth networks, supervision, and presentations
- research on telehealth
- online information and health data management
- healthcare system integration
- asset identification, listing, and patient to asset matching, and movement
- overall healthcare system management
- patient movement and remote admission
- Physical distancing to prevent transmission of communicable diseases

== Limitations and restrictions ==
While many branches of medicine have wanted to fully embrace telehealth for a long time, there are certain risks and barriers which bar the full amalgamation of telehealth into best practice. For a start, it is dubious as to whether a practitioner can fully leave the "hands-on" experience behind. Although it is predicted that telehealth will replace many consultations and other health interactions, it cannot yet fully replace a physical examination, this is particularly so in diagnostics, rehabilitation or mental health. To minimise safety issues, researchers have suggested not offering remote consultations for some conditions (breathing problems, new psychosis, or acute chest pain, for example), when a parent is very concerned about a child, when a condition has not resolved as expected or has worsened, or to people who might struggle to understand or be understood (such as those with limited English or learning difficulties).

The benefits posed by telehealth challenge the normative means of healthcare delivery set in both legislation and practice. Therefore, the growing prominence of telehealth is starting to underscore the need for updated regulations, guidelines and legislation which reflect the current and future trends of healthcare practices. Telehealth enables timely and flexible care to patients wherever they may be which reduces travel time; although this is a benefit, it also poses threats to privacy, safety , medical licensing and reimbursement, even so it still increases healthcare access and reduces costs. When a clinician and patient are in different locations, it is difficult to determine which laws apply to the context. Once healthcare crosses borders different state bodies are involved in order to regulate and maintain the level of care that is warranted to the patient or telehealth consumer. As it stands, telehealth is complex with many grey areas when put into practice especially as it crosses borders. This effectively limits the potential benefits of telehealth.

An example of these limitations include the current American reimbursement infrastructure, where Medicare will reimburse for telehealth services only when a patient is living in an area where specialists are in shortage, or in particular rural counties. The area is defined by whether it is a medical facility as opposed to a patient's' home. The site that the practitioner is in, however, is unrestricted. Medicare will only reimburse live video (synchronous) type services, not store-and-forward, mhealth or remote patient monitoring (if it does not involve live-video). Some insurers currently will reimburse telehealth, but not all yet. So providers and patients must go to the extra effort of finding the correct insurers before continuing. Again in America, states generally tend to require that clinicians are licensed to practice in the surgery' state, therefore they can only provide their service if licensed in an area that they do not live in themselves.

More specific and widely reaching laws, legislations and regulations will have to evolve with the technology. They will have to be fully agreed upon, for example, will all clinicians need full licensing in every community they provide telehealth services too, or could there be a limited use telehealth licence? Would the limited use licence cover all potential telehealth interventions, or only some? Who would be responsible if an emergency was occurring and the practitioner could not provide immediate help – would someone else have to be in the room with the patient at all consult times? Which state, city or country would the law apply in when a breach or malpractice occurred?

A major legal action prompt in telehealth thus far has been issues surrounding online prescribing and whether an appropriate clinician-patient relationship can be established online to make prescribing safe, making this an area that requires particular scrutiny. It may be required that the practitioner and patient involved must meet in person at least once before online prescribing can occur, or that at least a live-video conference must occur, not just impersonal questionnaires or surveys to determine need.

Telehealth has some potential for facilitating self-management techniques in health care, but for patients to benefit from it, the appropriate contact with, and relationship, between doctor and patient must be established first. This would start with an online consultation, providing patients with techniques and tools that help them participate in healthy behaviors, and initiating a collaborative partnership between health care professionals and patient. Self-management strategies fall into a broader category called patient activation, which is defined as a "patients' willingness and ability to take independent actions to manage their health." It can be achieved by increasing patients' knowledge and confidence in coping with and managing their own disease through a "regular assessment of progress [...] and problem-solving support." Teaching patients about their conditions and ways to cope with chronic illnesses will allow them to be knowledgeable about their disease and willing to manage it, improving their everyday life. Without a focus on the doctor-patient relationship and on the patient's understanding, telehealth cannot improve the quality of life of patients, despite the benefit of allowing them to do their medical check-ups from the comfort of their home.

The downsides of telemedicine include the cost of telecommunication and data management equipment and of technical training for medical personnel who will employ it. Virtual medical treatment also entails potentially decreased human interaction between medical professionals and patients, an increased risk of error when medical services are delivered in the absence of a registered professional, and an increased risk that protected health information may be compromised through electronic storage and transmission. There is also a concern that telemedicine may actually decrease time efficiency due to the difficulties of assessing and treating patients through virtual interactions; for example, it has been estimated that a teledermatology consultation can take up to thirty minutes, whereas fifteen minutes is typical for a traditional consultation. Additionally, potentially poor quality of transmitted records, such as images or patient progress reports, and decreased access to relevant clinical information are quality assurance risks that can compromise the quality and continuity of patient care for the reporting doctor. Other obstacles to the implementation of telemedicine include unclear legal regulation for some telemedical practices and difficulty claiming reimbursement from insurers or government programs in some fields. Some medical organizations have delivered position statement on the correct use of telemedicine in their field.

Another disadvantage of telemedicine is the inability to start treatment immediately. For example, a patient with a bacterial infection might be given an antibiotic hypodermic injection in the clinic, and observed for any reaction, before that antibiotic is prescribed in pill form.

Equitability is also a concern. Many families and individuals in the United States, and other countries, do not have internet access in their homes or the proper electronic devices to access services such as a laptop or smartphone.

== Ethical issues ==
Informed consent is another issue. When telehealth includes the possibility for technical problems such as transmission errors, security breaches, or storage issues, it can impact the system's ability to communicate. It may be wise to obtain informed consent in person first, as well as having backup options for when technical issues occur. In person, a patient can see who is involved in their care (namely themselves and their clinician in a consult), but online there will be other involved such as the technology providers, therefore consent may need to involve disclosure of anyone involved in the transmission of the information and the security that will keep their information private, and any legal malpractice cases may need to involve all of those involved as opposed to what would usually just be the practitioner.

== State of the market ==
The rate of adoption of telehealth services in any jurisdiction is frequently influenced by factors such as the adequacy and cost of existing conventional health services in meeting patient needs; the policies of governments and/or insurers with respect to coverage and payment for telehealth services; and medical licensing requirements that may inhibit or deter the provision of telehealth second opinions or primary consultations by physicians.

Projections for the growth of the telehealth market are optimistic, and much of this optimism is predicated upon the increasing demand for remote medical care. According to a recent survey, nearly three-quarters of U.S. consumers say they would use telehealth. At present, several major companies along with a bevvy of startups are working to develop a leading presence in the field.

In the UK, the Government's Care Services minister, Paul Burstow, has stated that telehealth and telecare would be extended over the next five years (2012–2017) to reach three million people.

=== United States ===
In the United States, telemedicine companies are collaborating with health insurers and other telemedicine providers to expand marketshare and patient access to telemedicine consultations.

As of 2019, 95% of employers believe their organizations will continue to provide health care benefits over the next five years.

The COVID-19 pandemic drove increased usage of telehealth services in the U.S. The U.S. Centers for Disease Control and Prevention reported a 154% increase in telehealth visits during the last week of March 2020, compared to the same dates in 2019.

=== Switzerland ===
From 1999 to 2018, the University Hospital of Zurich (USZ) offered clinical telemedicine and online medical advice on the Internet. A team of doctors answered around 2500 anonymous inquiries annually, usually within 24 to 48 hours. The team consisted of up to six physicians who are specialists in clinical telemedicine at the USZ and have many years of experience, particularly in internal and general medicine. In the entire period, 59360 inquiries were sent and answered. The majority of the users were female and on average 38 years old. However, in the course of time, considerably more men and older people began to use the service. The diversity of medical queries covered all categories of the International Statistical Classification of Diseases and Related Health Problems (ICD) and correlated with the statistical frequency of diseases in hospitals in Switzerland. Most of the inquiries concerned unclassified symptoms and signs, services related to reproduction, respiratory diseases, skin diseases, health services, diseases of the eye and nervous systems, injuries and disorders of the female genital tract. As with the Swedish online medical advice service, one-sixth of the requests related to often shameful and stigmatised diseases of the genitals, gastrointestinal tract, sexually transmitted infections, obesity and mental disorders. By providing an anonymous space where users can talk about (shameful) diseases, online telemedical services empower patients and their health literacy is enhanced by providing individualized health information. The Clinical Telemedicine and Online Counselling service of the University Hospital of Zurich is currently being revised and will be offered in a new form in the future.

== Developing countries ==
For developing countries, telemedicine and eHealth can be the only means of healthcare provision in remote areas. For example, the difficult financial situation in many African states and lack of trained health professionals has meant that the majority of the people in sub-Saharan Africa are badly disadvantaged in medical care, and in remote areas with low population density, direct healthcare provision is often very poor However, provision of telemedicine and eHealth from urban centers or from other countries is hampered by the lack of communications infrastructure, with no landline phone or broadband internet connection, little or no mobile connectivity, and often not even a reliable electricity supply.

=== Telemedicine in developing countries ===
==== Telemedicine in India ====
India has broad rural-urban population and rural India is bereaved from medical facilities, giving telemedicine a space for growth in India. Deprived education and medical professionals in rural areas is the reason behind government's ideology to use technology to bridge this gap. Remote areas not only present a number of challenges for the service providers but also for the families who are accessing these services. Since 2018, telemedicine has expanded in India. It has undertaken a new way for doctor consultations. On 25 March 2020, in the wake of COVID-19 pandemic, the Ministry of Health and Family Welfare issued India's Telemedicine Practice Guidelines. The Board of Governors entasked by the Health Ministry published an amendment to the Indian Medical Council (Professional Conduct, Etiquette and Ethics) Regulations, 2002 that gave much-needed statutory support for the practice of telemedicine in India. This sector is at an ever-growing stage with high scope of development. In April 2020, the union health ministry launched the eSanjeevani telemedicine service that operates at two levels: the doctor-to-doctor telemedicine platform, and the doctor-to-patient platform. This service crossed five million tele-consultations within a year of its launch indicating a conducive environment for acceptability and growth of telemedicine in India.

==== Telemedicine in Sub-Saharan Africa ====
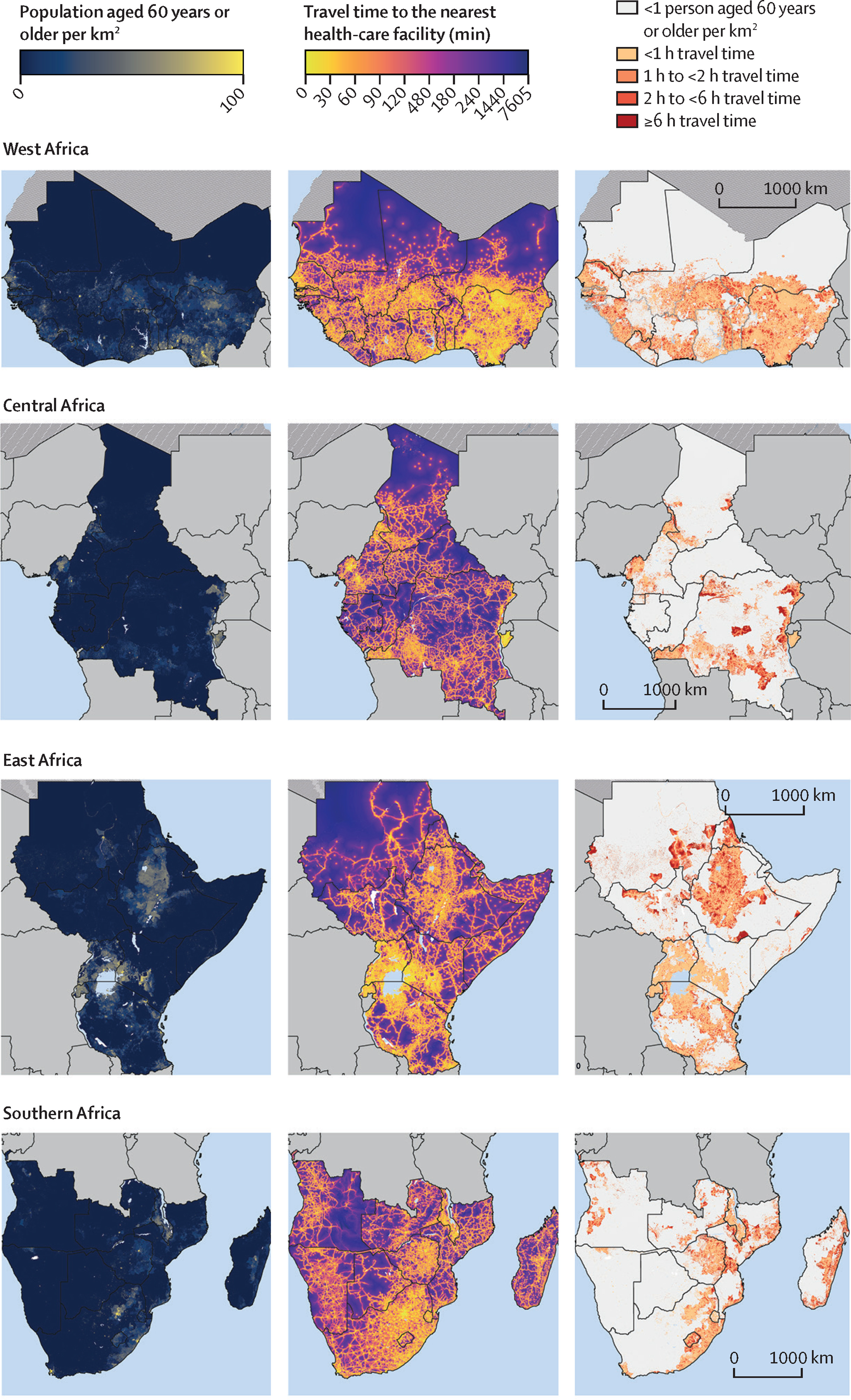
Travel time to the nearest health-care facility by Sub-Saharan African region, for adults aged 60 years or older

Sub-Saharan Africa is marked by the massive introduction of new technologies and internet access. Urban areas are facing a rapid change and development, and access to internet and health is rapidly improving. Population in remote areas however, still lack access to healthcare and modern technologies. Some people in rural regions must travel more between 2 and 6 hours to reach the closest healthcare facilities of their country. leaving room for telehealth to grow and reach isolated people in the near future.

=== Internet via satellite in rural areas ===
The Satellite African eHEalth vaLidation (SAHEL) demonstration project has shown how satellite broadband technology can be used to establish telemedicine in such areas. SAHEL was started in 2010 in Kenya and Senegal, providing self-contained, solar-powered internet terminals to rural villages for use by community nurses for collaboration with distant health centers for training, diagnosis and advice on local health issues. Those methods can have major impact on both health professionals to get and provide training from remote areas, and on the local population who can receive care without traveling long distances. Some non-profits provide internet to rural places around the world using a mobile VSAT terminal. This VSAT terminal equips remote regions allowing them to alert the world when there is a medical emergency, resulting in a rapid deployment or response from developed countries. Technologies such as the ones used by MAF allows health professionals in remote clinics to have internet access, making consultations much easier, both for patients and doctors.

In 2014, the government of Luxembourg, along with satellite operators and NGOs established SATMED, a multilayer eHealth platform to improve public health in remote areas of emerging and developing countries, using the Emergency.lu disaster relief satellite platform and the Astra 2G TV satellite. SATMED was first deployed in response to a report in 2014 by German Doctors of poor communications in Sierra Leone hampering the fight against Ebola, and SATMED equipment arrived in the Serabu clinic in Sierra Leone in December 2014. In June 2015 SATMED was deployed at Maternité Hospital in Ahozonnoude, Benin to provide remote consultation and monitoring, and is the only effective communication link between Ahozonnoude, the capital and a third hospital in Allada, since land routes are often inaccessible due to flooding during the rainy season.

== History ==
The development and history of telehealth or telemedicine (terms used interchangeably in literature) is deeply rooted in the history and development in not only technology but also society itself. Humans have long sought to relay important messages through torches, optical telegraphy, electroscopes, and wireless transmission. Early forms of telemedicine achieved with telephone and radio have been supplemented with videotelephony, advanced diagnostic methods supported by distributed client/server applications, and additionally with telemedical devices to support in-home care. Telehealth was originally developed to provide healthcare access for patients in rural and underserved communities where medical specialists were not readily available.

In the 21st century, with the advent of the internet, portable devices and other such digital devices are taking a transformative role in healthcare and its delivery.

=== Earliest instances ===
Although, traditional medicine relies on in-person care, the need and want for remote care has existed from the Roman and pre-Hippocratic periods in antiquity. The elderly and infirm who could not visit temples for medical care sent representatives to convey information on symptoms and bring home a diagnosis as well as treatment. In Africa, villagers would use smoke signals to warn neighboring villages of disease outbreak. The beginnings of telehealth have existed through primitive forms of communication and technology. The exact date of origin for Telehealth is unknown, but it was known to have been used during the Bubonic Plague. That version of telehealth was far different from how we know it today. During that time, they were communicating by heliograph and bonfire. Those were used to notify other groups of people about famine and war. Those are not using any form of technology yet but are starting to spread the idea of connectivity among groups of people who geographically could not be together.

=== 1800s to early 1900s ===
As technology developed and wired communication became increasingly commonplace, the ideas surrounding telehealth began emerging. The earliest telehealth encounter can be traced to Alexander Graham Bell in 1876, when he used his early telephone as a means of getting help from his assistant Mr. Watson after he spilt acid on his trousers. Another instance of early telehealth, specifically telemedicine was reported in The Lancet in 1879. An anonymous writer described a case where a doctor successfully diagnosed a child over the telephone in the middle of the night. This Lancet issue, also further discussed the potential of Remote Patient Care in order to avoid unnecessary house visits, which were part of routine health care during the 1800s. Other instances of telehealth during this period came from the American Civil War, during which telegraphs were used to deliver casualty/mortality lists, medical care to soldiers, and ordering further medical supplies.

As the 1900s started, physicians quickly found a use for the telephone making it a prime communication channel to contact patients and other physicians. Over the next fifty-plus years, the telephone was a staple for medical communication. As the 1930s came around, radio communication played a key role, especially during World War I. It was specifically used to communicate with remote areas such as Alaska and Australia. They used the radio to communicate medical information. During the Vietnam War, radio communication had become more advanced and was now used to send medical teams in helicopters to help. This then brought together the Aerial Medical Service (AMS) who used telegraphs, radios, and planes to help care for people who lived in remote areas.

From the late 1800s to the early 1900s the early foundations of wireless communication were laid down. Radios provided an easier and near instantaneous form of communication. The use of radio to deliver healthcare became accepted for remote areas. The Royal Flying Doctor Service in Australia is an example of the early adoption of radios in telehealth.

In 1925 the inventor Hugo Gernsback wrote an article for the magazine Science and Invention which included a prediction of a future where patients could be treated remotely by doctors through a device he called a "teledactyl". His descriptions of the device are similar to what would later become possible with new technology.

=== Mid-1900s to 1980s ===
When the American National Aeronautics and Space Administration (NASA) began plans to send astronauts into space, the need for telemedicine became clear. In order to monitor their astronauts in space, telemedicine capabilities were built into the spacecraft as well as the first spacesuits. Additionally, during this period, telehealth and telemedicine were promoted in different countries especially the United States and Canada. Carrier Sekani Family Services helped pioneer telehealth in British Columbia and Canada, according to its CEO Warner Adam. After the telegraph and telephone started to successfully help physicians treat patients from remote areas, telehealth became more recognized. Technological advancements occurred when NASA sent men to space. Engineers for NASA created biomedical telemetry and telecommunications systems. NASA technology monitored vitals such as blood pressure, heart rate, respiration rate, and temperature. After the technology was created, it then became the base of telehealth medicine for the public.

Massachusetts General Hospital and Boston's Logan International Airport had a role in the early use of telemedicine, which more or less coincided with NASA's foray into telemedicine through the use of physiologic monitors for astronauts. On October 26, 1960, a plane struck a flock of birds upon takeoff, killing many passengers and leaving a number wounded. Due to the extreme complexity of trying to get all the medical personnel out from the hospital, the practical solution became telehealth. This was expanded upon in 1967, when Dr. Kenneth_T._Bird at Massachusetts General founded one of the first telemedicine clinics. The clinic addressed the fundamental problem of delivering occupational and emergency health services to employees and travellers at the airport, located three congested miles from the hospital. Clinicians at the hospital would provide consultation services to patients who were at the airport. Consultations were achieved through microwave audio as well as video links. The airport began seeing over a hundred patients a day at its nurse-run clinic that cared for victims of plane crashes and other accidents, taking vital signs, electrocardiograms, and video images that were sent to Massachusetts General. Over 1,000 patients are documented as having received remote treatment from doctors at MGH using the clinic's two-way audiovisual microwave circuit. One notable story featured a woman who got off a flight in Boston and was experiencing chest pain. They performed a workup at the airport, took her to the telehealth suite where Raymond Murphy appeared on the television, and had a conversation with her. While this was happening, another doctor took notes and the nurses took vitals and any test that Murphy ordered. At this point, telehealth was becoming more mainstream and was starting to become more technologically advanced, which created a viable option for patients.

In 1964, the Nebraska Psychiatric Institute began using television links to form two-way communication with the Norfolk State Hospital which was 112 miles away for the education and consultation purposes between clinicians in the two locations.

In 1972 the Department of Health, Education and Welfare in the United States approved funding for seven telemedicine projects across different states. This funding was renewed and two further projects were funded the following year.

In March 1972, the San Bernardino County Medical Society officially implemented its Tel-Med program, a system of prerecorded health-related messages, with a log of 50 tapes. The nonprofit initiative began in 1971 as a local medical project to ease the doctor shortage in the expanding San Bernardino Valley and improve the public's access to sound medical information. It covered subjects ranging from cannabis to vaginitis. In January 1973, in response to the developing "London flu" epidemic hitting California and the country, a tape providing information on the disease was on air within a week after news broke of the flu spreading in the state. That spring, programs were implemented in San Diego and Indianapolis, Indiana, signaling a national acceptance of the concept. By 1979, its system offered messages on over 300 different subjects, 200 of which were available in Spanish as well as English, and serviced over 65 million people in 180 cities around the country.

=== 1980s to 1990s – maturation and renaissance ===
Telehealth projects underway before and during the 1980s would take off but fail to enter mainstream healthcare. As a result, this period of telehealth history is called the "maturation" stage and made way for sustainable growth. Although state funding in North America was beginning to run low, different hospitals began to launch their own telehealth initiatives. NASA provided an ATS-3 satellite to enable medical care communications of American Red Cross and Pan American Health Organization response teams, following the 1985 Mexico City earthquake. The agency then launched its SateLife/HealthNet programme to increase health service connectivity in developing countries. In 1997, NASA sponsored Yale's Medical Informatics and Technology Applications Consortium project.

Florida first experimented with "primitive" telehealth in its prisons during the latter 1980s. Working with Doctors Oscar W. Boultinghouse and Michael J. Davis, from the early 1990s to 2007; Glenn G. Hammack led the University of Texas Medical Branch (UTMB) development of a pioneering telehealth program in Texas state prisons. The three UTMB alumni would, in 2007, co-found telehealth provider NuPhysician.

The first interactive telemedicine system, operating over standard telephone lines, designed to remotely diagnose and treat patients requiring cardiac resuscitation (defibrillation) was developed and launched by an American company, MedPhone Corporation, in 1989. A year later under the leadership of its President/CEO S Eric Wachtel, MedPhone introduced a mobile cellular version, the MDPhone. Twelve hospitals in the U.S. served as receiving and treatment centers.

=== At-home virtual care ===
As the expansion of telehealth continued in 1990 Maritime Health Services (MHS) was a big part of the initiation for occupational health services. They sent a medical officer aboard the Pacific trawler that allowed for round-the-clock communication with a physician. The system that allows for this is called the Medical Consultation Network (MedNet). MedNet is a video chatting system that has live audio and visual so the physician on the other end of the call can see and hear what is happening. MetNet can be used from anywhere, not just aboard ships. Being able to provide onsite visual information allows remote patients expert emergency help and medical attention that saves money as well as lives. This has created a demand for at-home monitoring. At-home care has also become a large part of telehealth. Doctors or nurses will now give pre-op and post-op phone calls to check-in. There are also companies such as Lifeline, which give the elderly a button to press in case of an emergency. That button will automatically call for emergency help. If someone has surgery and then is sent home, telehealth allows physicians to see how the patient is progressing without them having to stay in the hospital. TeleDiagnostic Systems of San Francisco is a company that has created a device that monitors sleep patterns, so people with sleep disorders do not have to stay the night at the hospital. Another at-home device that was created was the Wanderer, which was attached to Alzheimer's patients or people who had dementia. It was attached to them so when they wandered off it notified the staff to allow them to go after them. All these devices allowed healthcare beyond hospitals to improve, which means that more people are being helped efficiently.

=== 2000s to present ===
The advent of high-speed Internet, and the increasing adoption of ICT in traditional methods of care, spurred advances in telehealth delivery. Increased access to portable devices, like laptops and mobile phones, made telehealth more plausible; the industry then expanded into health promotion, prevention and education.

In 2002, G. Byron Brooks, a former NASA surgeon and engineer who had also helped manage the UTMB Telemedicine program, co-founded Teladoc in Dallas, Texas, which was then launched in 2005 as the first national telehealth provider.

In the 2010s, integration of smart home telehealth technologies, such as health and wellness devices, software, and integrated IoT, has accelerated the industry. Healthcare organizations are increasingly adopting the use of self-tracking and cloud-based technologies, and innovative data analytic approaches to accelerate telehealth delivery.

In 2015, Mercy Health system opened Mercy Virtual, in Chesterfield, Missouri, the world's first medical facility dedicated solely to telemedicine.

==== COVID-19 ====
Telehealth expanded significantly during the COVID-19 pandemic, becoming a vital means of medical communication. It allows doctors to return to humanizing the patient. It forces them to listen to what people have to say and from there make a diagnosis. Studies have demonstrated high trust in telehealth expressed by patients during the COVID-19 pandemic. Among patients with Inflammatory bowel disease 4 out of 5 considered telemedicine as valuable tool for their management, and 85%) wanted to have a telemedicine service at their center. However, only 1 out of 4 believed that it may guarantee the same level of care as the in-person visit. Some researchers claim this creates an environment that encourages greater vulnerability among patients in self disclosure in the practice of narrative medicine. Telehealth allows for Zoom calls and video chats from across the world checking in on patients and speaking to physicians. Universities are now ensuring that medical students graduate with proficient telehealth communication skills. Experts suggest that telehealth has become a vital part of medical care; with more virtual options becoming available. The pandemic era also identified the "potential to significantly improve global health equity" through telehealth and other virtual care technologies.

== Telehealth versus in-person on treatment and follow-up visits study ==
A retrospective study in 2023 examining 1,589,014 adult primary care patients within an integrated healthcare system in the U.S. found that patients who initially had a telehealth visit were less likely to receive prescriptions, lab tests, or imaging compared to those who had an in-office visit. However, these same telehealth patients had higher rates of in-person follow-up visits. The study revealed that, out of the 2,357,598 primary care visits, 49.2% were in-office, 31.3% were telephone visits, and 19.5% were video visits. Office visits led to higher rates of prescriptions (46.8%), lab tests (41.4%), and imaging (20.5%) compared to video (38.4%, 27.4%, and 11.9%, respectively) and telephone visits (34.6%, 22.8%, and 8.7%, respectively). In contrast, patients who had telephone or video visits were more likely to have in-person follow-up visits, with 7.6% of telephone, 6.2% of video, and only 1.3% of office visit patients returning for primary care follow-up. Furthermore, rates of emergency department visits and hospitalizations were higher for those who had telemedicine visits, though these differences were minimal. The study's limitations include the inability to generalize findings to healthcare settings without telemedicine services or to patients without insurance or a primary care provider. The reasons for increased in-person healthcare utilization were also not captured, and long-term follow-up was not conducted.

== See also ==
- Artificial intelligence in healthcare
- American Telemedicine Association
- American Well
- Center for Telehealth and E-Health Law
- Connected health
- Decentralised clinical trial
- eHealth
- In absentia health care
- Mercy Virtual
- mHealth
- Myca
- National Rural Health Association
- Data sharing between doctors through mixed reality headsets
- Remote therapy
- Ronald S. Weinstein
- Smart city
- Tele-epidemiology
- Teladoc
- Telecare
- Telemedicine service providers
- Telemental health
- Teleneuropsychology
- Telenursing
- Telepathology
- Telepsychology
- UNESCO Chair in Telemedicine
