= Death in absentia =

Death in absentia may refer to:

- Declared death in absentia
- Sentenced to death in absentia, see trial in absentia

== See also ==
- In absentia (disambiguation)
