= Tele-audiology =

Use of telemedicine to provide audiological services

Tele-audiology is the utilization of telemedicine to provide audiological services and may include the full scope of audiological practice.

This term was first used by Dr. Gregg Givens in 1999 in reference to a system being developed at East Carolina University in North Carolina, US. The first Internet audiological test was accomplished in 2000 by Givens, Balch and Keller.

The first Transatlantic teleaudiology test was performed in April 2009 when Dr James Hall tested a patient in South Africa from Dallas at the AAA conference. Since that historic event the interest in tele-audiology increased significantly.

There are 2 types of teleaudiology tests:

- Store-and-forward (Asynchronous) tests: Testing a patient and then transferring the results via emailing or the Internet to a professional that will look at the results
- Real-time (Synchronous) tests: Testing a patient in real-time as if the patient is sitting in front of you. Audiologists are used to testing patients remotely because testing a patient in a sound booth while the audiologist sits outside the booth is virtually the same as testing a patient over the Internet. The window is not a real glass window but a teleconference window. The only real difference is that the physical distance changed.
