= TeleMAT =

TeleMAT, also known as Tele-MOUD (medication for opioid use disorder via telemedicine), is the combination of telehealth services and Medication-Assisted Treatment (MAT) with Buprenorphine for Opioid Use Disorder (OUD) patients.

== Overview ==
According to the Substance Abuse and Mental Health Services Administration (SAMHSA), the term “MAT” refers to the "use of medications, in combination with counseling and behavioral therapies, to provide a ‘whole-patient’ approach to the treatment of substance use disorders.” The administration also notes the importance of addressing other health conditions during treatment.

The U.S. Department of Health and Human Services (HHS) defines Telehealth, or telemedicine, as a course of care that “lets your health care provider provide care for you without an in-person office visit. Telehealth is done primarily online with internet access on your computer, tablet, or smartphone."

In 2019, the term “TeleMAT” was coined by the QuickMD team to refer to the service of providing MAT to patients via telehealth.
