= Telecare =

Technology-based healthcare and social care

Telecare is technology-based health care and social care, such as the monitoring of patient vital organs so that they may remain safe and independent in their own homes. Devices may include health and fitness apps, such as exercise tracking tools and digital medication reminder apps, or technologies that issue early warning and detection. The use of sensors may be part of a package which can provide support for people with illnesses such as dementia, or people at risk of falling.

Most telecare mitigates harm by reacting to untoward events and raising a help response quickly. Some telecare, such as safety confirmation and lifestyle monitoring have a preventive function in that a deterioration in the telecare user's wellbeing can be spotted at an early stage.

Telecare is different from telemedicine and telehealth. Telecare refers to the idea of enabling people to remain independent in their own homes by providing person-centred technologies to support the individual or their carers.

Mobile telecare is an emerging service where state of the art mobile devices with roaming SIMs allow a client to go outside but still have a 24/7 telecare service available to support them.

The meaning and usage of the term 'telecare' has not yet settled into consistent use. In the United Kingdom, it is grounded in the social care framework and focuses on the meaning described above. In other countries 'telecare' may be applied to the practice of healthcare at a distance.

== Uses of telecaster ==
In its simplest form, it can refer to a fixed or mobile telephone with a connection to a monitoring centre through which the user can raise an alarm. Technologically more advanced systems use sensors through which specific potential risks can be monitored. These may include falls, as well as environmental changes in the home such as floods, fire and gas leaks. Carers of people with dementia may be alerted if the person leaves the house or other defined area. When a sensor is activated it sends a radio signal to a central unit in the user's home, which then automatically calls a 24-hour monitoring centre where trained operators can take appropriate action, such as contacting a local key holder, doctor or the emergency services.

Telecare also includes standalone telecare which does not send signals to a response centre, but supports carers through providing local (in-house) alerts in a person's home to let the carer know when a person requires attention.

There is a range of telecare services available with some of the most well known being the medical alarm, mobile carephone system, pill dispenser, telephone prompt service, movement monitoring and fall detector. Multi-lingual telecare services have been introduced.

== Telecare in the UK ==
In 2005 the UK's Department of Health and Social Care published Building Telecare in England to coincide with the announcement of a grant to encourage its take up by local councils with social care responsibilities.

The UK's Department of Health's Whole System Demonstrator (WSD) launched in May 2008. It is the largest randomised control trial of telehealth and telecare in the world, involving 6191 patients and 238 GP practices across three sites, Newham, Kent and Cornwall. The trials were evaluated by: City University London, University of Oxford, University of Manchester, Nuffield Trust, Imperial College London and London School of Economics. The WSD headline findings after the telehealth trial, involving 3154 patients, included these outcomes:

- 45% reduction in mortality rates
- 20% reduction in emergency admissions
- 15% reduction in A&E visits
- 14% reduction in elective admissions
- 14% reduction in bed days
- 8% reduction in tariff costs

The telecare findings were supposed to be published at some point in the future. In fact they have never surfaced. Some patients are still hopeful that telecare will lead to substantial improvements in the quality of services. The research showed that the telecare approach was not cost-effective, with an incremental cost per QALY when added to usual care of £92,000.

The Government's Care Services minister, Paul Burstow, said in 2012 that telehealth and telecare would be extended over the next five years (2012-2017) to reach three million people. This ambition was formally abandoned in November 2013. In September 2014 NHS England announced a replacement, but much lower profile, new "technology enabled care services" programme.

== See also ==
- Assistive technology
- Friendly caller program
- Wandering (dementia)
