= UNESCO Chair in Telemedicine =

UNESCO Chair of Telemedicine (UNES_CT) is an agency within UNESCO that was founded in 1999.

UNES_CT is tasked with developing and spreading Telemedicine and Information Society in Health Care in developing areas, particularly in South-America and Africa.

== Activities ==
The expertise of UNES_CT as a University Institution is based in the previous CATAI's expertise founded in 1994 in the field of Information Society / Telemedicine with which is collaborating closely and from which received part of the sponsorship.

Activities include: training and teaching aspects, to gain a minimal structured knowledge in Medical Informatics, have established the "Telemedicine Body of Knowledge" covering sociology, economics, technology transfer, technology and organizational issues, standardization, security and liability aspects in co-operation with the Universities of Queens (United Kingdom), Aveiro-PT, Belfast-IRL, Genova-IT, Innsbruck-AU, Udine-IT, Berlin-D, Athens-GR. CATAI published the first text-book of Telemedicine in English, complemented with CD multimedia material particularly designed for developing countries, worldwide known by Winter and Summer Courses of Telemedicine training following the "Telemedicine Body of Knowledge". At the present moment the book is translated into 6 languages (SP, E, IT, GR, FR, D) and is published in Spanish (PanAmerican Editorial) with title: "Telemedicine" 2001, and is participating in all editions of the European Telemedicine Glossary edited by the EC-DG Information Society. In the 4th Ed-2002 is the author of the Electronic Clinical Record.

== History ==
CATAI developed the Videophone network in the Canary Islands in 1991 for distant support. At the present it includes the best practice implementation pilots in phone medicine (oncology, particularly home care, and psychiatry, particularly childhood psychiatry), Tele-ECG and Tele-ultrasounds, particularly obstetrics and gynaecology.

The first in the world to carry out distant DNA quantitation (in 1991), it was applied to image analysis for prognostic factors in breast cancer. Objective image analysis and prognostic factors have been incorporated into the regional breast cancer registry of over 3000 patients (see above).

CATAI was the promoter of the Centre of Excellence in Telemedicine, sponsored by Science Park DG-XIII, with enrolment of 3 continents: Europe, Africa and America to concentrate best practice examples as well as top experts to implement real world applications and development of hardware-software systems ready to be used. These activities link mainly technological firms of the UK and Germany.

UNES_CT was leader of two EU projects (Leonardo-DG XXII; Science Park-DGXIII) and participating in other two (DGXIII- Teleultrasound for developing countries; Leonardo-DGXXII Teaching Medical informatics), and leader in Canary Islands and in the main land, Barcelona, of a project on Telephonic Medicine. Partner in 5 EU projects (Smart-USB; KOD or knowledge on demand, ASKLEPIOS, CHS or Citizen Home Services, CATAI-CTC).

UNES_CT was involved in developing countries' health support through the Midjan group-ITU-D working group of Telemedicine, TeleInViVo ultrasound devices with pilots in Katastan, Mali and Uganda. Additionally, the UNESCO chair was promoted the network of Telemedicine together with Argentina, Venezuela, Peru, and participated in ITU-Developing World Congress in Malta 1997, and Georgia Telemedicine meeting in 1999. The group is currently actively working with South America (Venezuela, Argentina, Cuba, Chile, Peru) and Africa (Uganda, Kenya).

== Awards ==
- Economical initiatives, Canary islands 1995
- Ordesa award in paediatrics 1989
- Award Portugal-Spanish cooperation 1994
- Award Royal Academy Medicine 1993 and 1999
- Included in "Who is Who in the World" since 1996 scheduled up to 2000. Included in the 3rd Ed. of "Who is Who in Science and Engineering"
- the Lattice Price 99 of ESF (European Science Foundation) in Innovation & Research in teaching, nominated by the STOA European Parliament Office
