= In absentia =

Absentia is Latin for absence. In absentia, a legal term, is Latin for "in the absence" or "while absent".

(In) absentia may also refer to:

- Award in absentia
- Declared death in absentia, or simply, death in absentia, legally declared death without a body
- Election in absentia
- Excommunication in absentia
- Graduation in absentia
- In absentia health care, the provision of healthcare in the absence of a personal contact
- Trial in absentia

== Music, films and television ==
- In Absentia (film), a 2000 short film commissioned by the BBC
- In Absentia, a 2002 album by Porcupine Tree
- Absentia (film), a 2011 horror film
- "In Absentia" (Fringe), a 2012 episode of the television series Fringe
- Absentia (TV series), a 2017 television series
