= Mercy Virtual =

Geography
- Location: 15740 S Outer Forty Rd, Chesterfield, Missouri, United States
- Coordinates: 38.6504°N 90.5589°W

Organization
- Type: Telemedicine
- Network: Mercy Health System

History
- Opened: October 2015

Links
- Website: https://www.mercyvirtual.net/
- Lists: Hospitals in Missouri

Mercy Virtual is a virtual care center (also called a "virtual hospital") in Chesterfield, Missouri, a suburb of St. Louis, which operates solely through the use of telemedicine—the first facility of its kind in the world.

Mercy Virtual provides remote services to patients in Mercy system hospitals and medical offices, and to other partner hospitals, by providing diagnosis, prognosis and treatment suggestions and remotely monitors individual patient health. Mercy Virtual monitors patients with special devices that report data which allows ongoing management of health conditions remotely, both at hospitals or outside a medical institution. Mercy Virtual operated without lack of Medicare or Medicaid funding for telemedicine services, but this was temporarily waived at the onset of the COVID-19 pandemic. The facility contains 300,000 square feet of workspace on a 41-acre site and cost $54 million to develop. The facility provides office environments, videoconferencing rooms and meeting rooms to provide a work environment for nurses, doctors and other healthcare workers staffed at the facility. Mercy Virtual has partnerships to provide telemedicine services to patients of the UNC Health system, Pennsylvania State medical center and the Allegheny Health Network.
