= Myca =

Myca is a software development company specializing in healthcare. It is headquartered in Quebec City, Quebec, Canada, with U.S. offices in New York City.

== History ==
Myca was founded in 2002 by Nathanial B. Findlay. The company's first product was a mobile nutrition platform called MyFoodPhone. MyFoodPhone is a small cell-phone application that provides customers with a full nutrition journal and access to a nutrition professional. Customers take a picture of their meals and send them via MyFoodPhone to be analyzed by a personal nutrition coach or advisor.

MyFoodPhone was rebranded as Myca Nutrition in 2007.

== Activities ==
Started in 2007, Myca developed a practice management system that allows physicians to perform remote consultations by using videoconferencing, instant messaging, phone, mobile and secure email. With this platform, patients can schedule either home, clinic or online appointments with a doctor. The Myca platform provides a full billing back-end service that allows doctors to be reimbursed for their remote visits.

The Myca Platform is commercialized in the United States under the Hello Health trademark. Hello Health operates under the software as a service business model, so patients sign up online to communicate with their physician.

Myca launched its first Hello Health clinic in July 2008 in Williamsburg, Brooklyn, New York. Jay Parkinson, Sean Khozin and Devlyn Corrigan were the first Hello Health doctors and operated the Williamsburg clinic. Doctors are highly implicated in the Hello Health product definition as well. The company plan to offer its service elsewhere in the New York area

== Partnerships ==
Myca is a gold member of the Wireless Life Science Alliance, founded by Qualcomm Inc., hosted in San Diego, California.
