= Telehaptics =

Haptic sensations sent over a network

Telehaptic is the term for computer generated tactile (tangible or touch) sensations (haptics) over a network, between physically distant human beings, or between a local user and a remote location, using sensors and effectors. Microcontrollers input information from sensors, and control effectors to create human sensations as outputs.

Sensors range from pressure, temperature and kinesthetic sensing devices, to biofeedback equipment. Haptic effectors, evoking precise perceivable sensations, range from small motors, fans, heating elements, or vibrators; to micro-voltage electrodes which gently stimulate areas of the skin (creating subtle, localized, "tingling" electrotactile sensations). Telehaptic interactivity, a form of assistive technology, may involve synesthesia; e.g. sensed inputs such as breathing, brain activity, or heartbeats might be presented as gentle, precisely variable bodily sensations in any combination, including warmth, cold, vibration, pressure, etc.; opening possibilities for levels of awareness, and interpersonal communication, difficult (or impossible) to attain prior to telehaptic (and biofeedback) technologies.

One of the challenges entailed in telehaptic applications involves the requirement for stability and the synchronized functioning of multiple tasks in order to effectively operate in a real-time environment.

== Applications ==
Interaction using telehaptic technology offers a new approach to communication including interpersonal interaction. It can be deployed to carry out telehealth encounters and the so-called telerehabilitation. Since the technology provides sensed inputs such as brain activity, heartbeats, and breathing, it creates an effective telehealth encounter that can enable real-time examination by a health professional. Telehaptic interactivity is now being integrated in therapy such as in sampling the position of body parts and the provision of resistive forces using telehaptic virtual gloves. Once challenges involving the irregularities of the communication network, delay, jitter, and packet loss, among others are addressed, telesurgery is also expected to advance.

Telehaptic systems are also useful in different handling applications. There are researcher, for instance, who are able to utilize its interfaces to perform actions such as pushing or more complicated tasks that require dexterity like grasping micro-objects. That is why, while the technology has not been perfected yet, scientists are optimistic about its potential. It means that telehaptic applications could play an important role in the future of microassembly and biological applications (e.g. handling cells and tissues). The concept of teleoperation, which involves the remote operation of a machine, demonstrates the potential of telehaptic technology application in the case of risky activities and tasks such as nuclear waste disposal and wreckage exploration.

== See also ==
- Teledildonics
