= Safety confirmation =

A Safety confirmation system is a way of determining each day whether someone who lives alone is safe. All the person has to do is to press, before a time agreed with him or her, an 'I am okay' button on a special landline or mobile phone handset that can also be used normally to make calls. The button-press is transmitted to a monitoring centre and managed automatically. A follow-up system is initiated if a user fails to confirm that they are okay. If the button is not pressed by the agreed time it can be taken as a passive request for contact.

By the application of 'lean' design, the process of Safety Confirmation is conceptually simple, especially for people who use it but, as it has to be highly dependable and work reliably over different providers' phone networks, the technology that runs it is complex.

Safety confirmation was invented and brought to market by James Batchelor (May 28, 1977, Yorkshire, England), a British technology entrepreneur and inventor who created it when he spotted the shortcomings of the predominant paradigm of personal safety alarms (also known as: community alarms; pendant alarms; autodialer alarms; medical alerts or personal emergency response systems (PERS)) after his grandmother fell.

Conventionally, people who may be prone to falling or medical emergencies are provided with a button to press if they need help, which raises a call to a monitoring centre (as in the famous US TV advertisement "Help, I've Fallen and I Can't Get up"). A study reported in 2010 found that only 8% of people with pendant alarms wore them at all times and that two-thirds had never used them.

By reversing the conventional paradigm safety confirmation provides reassurance for carers and avoids the situation where a person with a conventional alarm system is unable or unwilling to use it. The supplier reports that sudden changes in a daily pattern of the 'I am OK' button presses can be indicative of changes in general well being and, as the system is so simple to use, it functions as a cognitive test with deteriorating performance indicating that the user is developing further needs.

Safety confirmation systems have been on sale in the UK since at least 2005 and is used by local councils as part of their preventative telecare strategy.
