= In absentia health care =

Provision of healthcare without personal contact

The most common mode of healthcare delivery is through personal, face-to-face contact between a healthcare provider and a beneficiary (patient). There is, however, an increasing trend towards the provision of healthcare in the absence of personal contact. This limit of contact during patient care is known as in absentia health care.

== Health care without face-to-face contact ==
In Absentia healthcare, or distance medicine, occurs when the patient and care giver are at different locations, but still communicate by audio and video, or sometimes without any personal contact. A face-to-face contact is often a necessary prelude to rendering health care.

This, however, may not be necessary for care; in fact current technologies permit with no prior or concurrent contact. Some people argue that this type of in absentia medical care may derail the traditional sequences of examination, diagnosis and treatment, and that such a detour may challenge existing values of modern medicine. In absentia care assumes heightened relevance today because it is both convenient and risky.

Easy questionnaire-based online access to healthcare is convenient. The same resources provide hazardous pharmaceuticals, addictive and life style altering drugs.

== A history of in absentia care ==
Aspects of online medicine have been described as an "asynchronous written exchange," and a "disembodied relationship," with "few analogues or precedents in medical practice." This trend has also been viewed as perhaps "anarchic" with potential to "set off a revolution in remote care" and promote "self-diagnosis." The safety of online consultations by "Cyberdoctors" has also been seriously questioned.

=== Ancient practices ===
Ancient Egypt emphasized a tripartite system which exists even to this day. This system called for listening to the patient before an examination. Only after an observation, or an examination, did a diagnosis follow. Treatment was undertaken as the last component. Observation and examination before treatment played a central role that could not easily be circumvented. This sequence has been passed on as a tradition to us through Hippocrates and Galen.

During the height of Arabic and Jewish medicine (732–1096 CE), diagnosis called for an orderly sequence where examination, "by the feel of the hands," played an essential role. Ideally, healing entailed contact between the patient and a healer. Still, the practice of eliminating this personal contact as a prerequisite to healing was not unheard of.

At a later time when astrology, animal products, magic and incantations were part of the healing arts, formal contact with healers may have gradually become unnecessary. Ill-health was often viewed as the result of malevolent external influences. Amulets and ligatures were worn as barriers to ward off such evil demons. Sufferers wore them, stuck them under their pillows or hung them at doorways.

==== Galen ====
Galen (129–200 CE) chose, at times, to prescribe to patients without ever seeing them. Apparently, Galen was so skilled in understanding symptomatology that there were times when he preferred to diagnose without questioning the patient. He then went on to prescribe by mail with confidence. His elevated status permitted him to offer consultations by letter. He would receive generous rewards for his postal consultations: in one instance, it is said that he had received 400 gold pieces for curing a woman in this fashion.

=== More recent historical practices ===
==== Renaudot ====
The French physician and philanthropist Théophraste Renaudot (1584–1653) established a Paris practice that offered free treatment to the sick who were too poor to engage a physician. Renaudot's published a booklet titled, "La presence des absence" (The Presence of the Absent). The booklet listed a series of symptoms and carried diagrams of body parts. Patients were required to identify symptoms and check off body parts that hurt. This booklet enabled a patient to receive a diagnosis and treatment by post without a personal visit to the physician.

In Europe and England, between 1600 and 1800, dispensing and advising without direct contact with ailing persons had become a common practice. At that time, physical examination techniques were in their infancy. Auscultation (listening to the chest with a stethoscope) and ophthalmoscopy (examination of the interior of the eyes) had not found their way into the discipline of an examination until the early-to-mid-19th century.

At best, most physicians simply observed the patient's appearance and colour, and palpated the pulse. Any further physical examination was unnecessary.

==== Heberdeen ====
William Heberden (1710–1801), of angina pectoris (chest pain indicative of impaired blood supply to the heart muscle, and an impending heart attack) fame, had a reputation for his diagnostic skills merely through his "expert gaze." Diagnosis depended heavily on the listener's interpretive skills, and treatment relied more on compassion than medicinal chemistry. The conversations with the patients revealed more clues than the actual examination did. Thus, this was an environment which tolerated and even nurtured therapeutic initiatives without physical contact by doctors.

==== Boerhaave ====
The new-found notion of physical diagnosis was not the only reason for the growth of in absentia practice in the 17th and 18th centuries. Another major obstacle to face-to-face contact was the difficulty posed by distance and poor travel conditions. Because of this it was convenient for patients and their caregivers to seek medical help by writing to physicians of repute.

Herman Boerhaave (1668–1738) was at ease with such a concept and practice. He dispensed advice to other colleagues and apothecaries by mail. Erasmus Darwin (1731–1802), grandfather of Charles Darwin, treated a patient with dizziness, not by seeing him but by recommending "scarifications" (making scars) on the back.

==== Cullen ====
William Cullen (1710–1790) of Edinburgh, Scotland had engaged in a flourishing mail order practice. In his early years of practice between 1764 and 1774, Cullen wrote approximately 20 consultation letters per year. This number jumped markedly to almost 200 a year from 1774 until his death in 1790. He had used an amanuensis and an early version of a copying machine to make it quicker and easier for him to respond. If he did not know the condition well, he cautiously avoided making a diagnosis. For the acutely ill, he preferred hospital admission and personal care. Cullen had recognized long ago the limitations of in absentia care.

==== Morgan ====
John Morgan (1735–1789) of Philadelphia, a founder of the University of Pennsylvania medical school in 1765, was equally active with regard to postal consultations. Morgan had studied under Cullen in Edinburgh between 1761 and 1764. He had announced his willingness to consult by post for those patients residing at a distance from Philadelphia. In absentia mail order treatments were popular, and moreover, turned out to be quite profitable.

==== Johnston ====
In addition to letters from patients, early physicians also recognised the importance of examining bodily excretions in establishing a diagnosis. Nathaniel Johnston (1627–1705) had carried out an extensive correspondence practice with his patients. In one instance a writer had sent a letter to him enclosing specimens of his wife's sputum and urine as samples. He had hoped that Johnston might use the specimens to narrow the diagnosis of his wife's chronic cough.

Even as early as the 1830s, there was an attempt at reducing the subjectivity of findings and narrations. Julius Herisson, an early inventor of sphygmomanometer (blood pressure measuring apparatus) in 1834, recommended that numerical aspects (quantitative data such as beats per minute) of pulse were more informative than their descriptive characteristics.

He had realised that actually seeing the patient was not an absolute requirement for reaching a diagnosis. This may well have been what led up to the data exchange that is now a common practice on the internet.

Not all in absentia diagnoses were based on honourable intentions: in the period 1900–1930, radio advertising arrived. Radio, much like the internet now, was a troublesome medium then. It presented new opportunities for technophiles of that period. A Kansas physician by the name of John R. Brinkley (1885–1942) exploited this new medium to maximum advantage between the years 1928 and 1941.

==== John R. Brinkley ====
Brinkley's life and career have been the subject of several books and theses. Perceiving an opportunity to advertise his skills, he exploited the emerging medium of radio broadcasting. Radio allowed him to spread the news of his surgery and also to start a "Medical Question Box." His live radio broadcasts diagnosed diseases of patients who wrote to him describing their symptoms. He then prescribed medication to his patients, having never set eyes on them; this brought him great wealth. The Federal Radio Commission, and later the Federal Communications Commission attempted to prosecute him, and much legal protesting on his part followed. In spite of this, in 1941, his radio career ended for good.

Brinkley justified his in absentia practice using his own interpretation of the history of medicine. He cited the practice of an 18th-century Swiss mountain doctor by the name of Michael Schuppach (1707–1781). Schuppach had practiced diagnosis and treatment by drawing on the powers of nature. His reputation was such that he could diagnose illnesses by the smell of a patient's shirt, or a flask of patient's urine mailed to him. Brinkley drew from history selectively to bolster his convictions.

== Comparisons ==
Contemporary technology allows the transmission of videos, photos, and data to distant sites. Remote viewing of images and data are acceptable, but are no substitute for physical contact. This is especially the case with telemedicine, when a physician may consult with a remotely sited consultant. Here, however, a patient-physician relationship already exists between two parties. Indeed, data exchange serves as latter day equivalent of a third party physical examination in such instances.

Technology permits this kind of healthcare without any primary contact with a qualified caregiver. This type of care, "between strangers," is cheaper, quicker, and more convenient. The worried-well may seek care for discomfort that past generations would have dismissed as trivial or inevitable.

The same electronic information technologies that aid the health-providers also empower the health-seekers who can gain easier access, whilst remaining anonymous.
