= Poaching (disambiguation) =

Poaching is illegal hunting or fishing.

Poaching or poach may also refer to:

== Food ==
- Poaching (cooking)

== People ==
- Amanda Poach (born 1987), American soccer player
- Andreas Poach (1515–1585), German theologian

== Sport ==
- Poach (pickleball), a type of shot in the sport of pickleball
- Poaching (snowboarding), snowboarding at a resort where snowboards are explicitly prohibited.
- Poaching (tennis), when a doubles player aggressively moves across the court to volley a ball intended for their partner.

== Other uses ==
- Mate poaching in animals, seduction of an animal who has already established a bond with another creature
  - Human mate poaching, in human infidelity
- Employee poaching, the recruitment of employees directly from a business competitor
  - Antipoaching, practices intended to protect against employee poaching

== See also ==
- Poacher (disambiguation)
