= Arnnon Geshuri =

American corporate executive (born 1969)

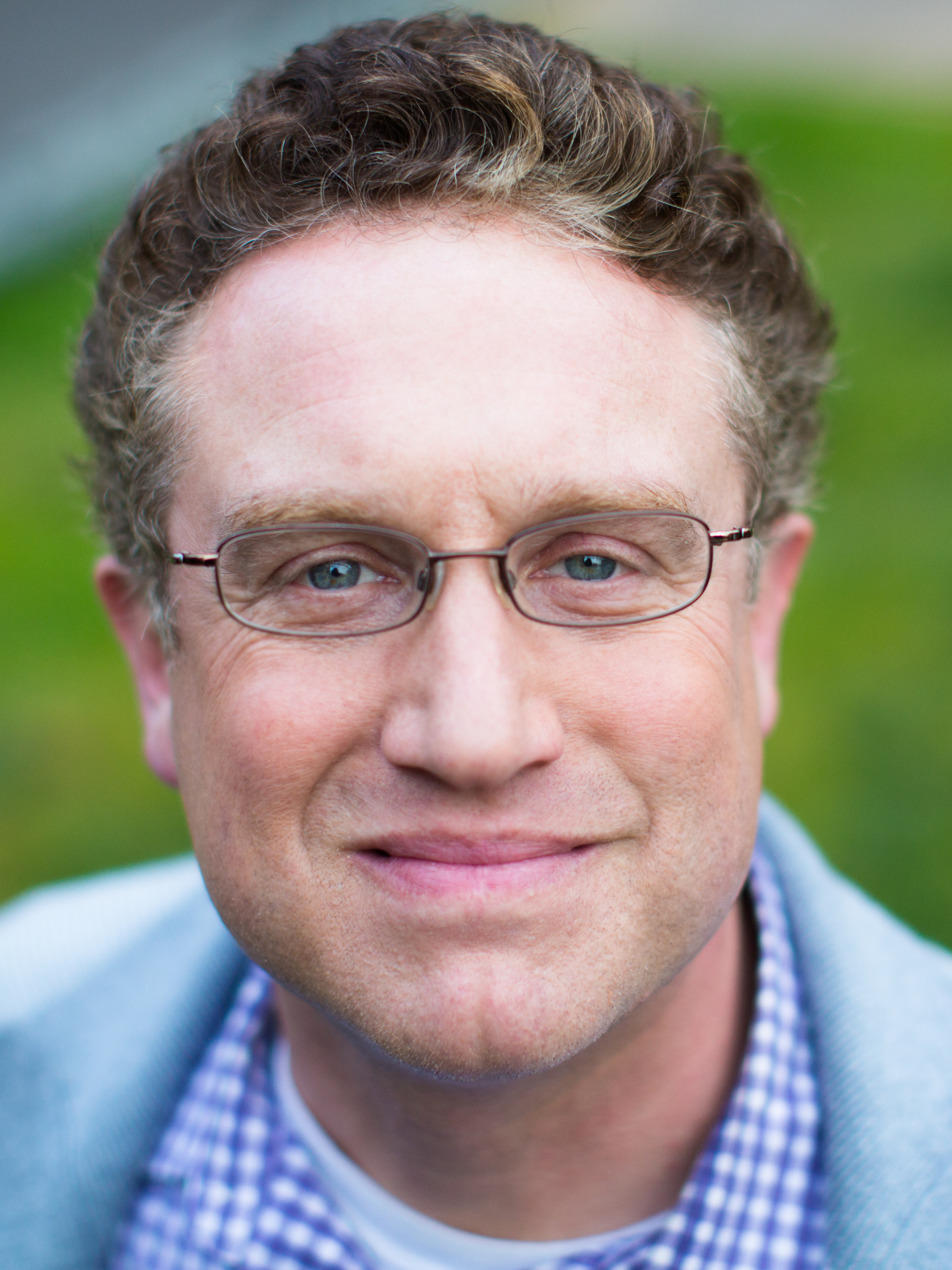
- Geshuri in 2016
- Born: ≈1969 (age 56–57)
- Education: University of California, Irvine; San Jose State University
- Occupation: Human resources business executive

Arnnon Geshuri (born 1969 or 1970) is an American corporate executive. He was vice president of human resources at Tesla, Inc. from 2009 until 2017, senior director of human resources and staffing at Google from 2004 to 2009, and vice president of people operations and director of global staffing at E-Trade Financial Corporation circa 2002. 2023-24 he was the Chief People Officer at Teladoc Health. Starting mid-2024, he is the Chief People Officer at Snowflake Inc.. In January 2016, he briefly served on the Wikimedia Foundation's board of trustees before stepping down under pressure.

== Personal life ==
Geshuri was born in 1969 or 1970. His father, Yosef Geshuri, is a clinical psychologist with a Ph.D. in psychology. In Arnnon Geshuri's early life, his father worked at Northwest Missouri State University in Maryville, Missouri, and he attended elementary school there at the university until the fifth or sixth grade. In 1980 his family moved to Porterville, California, a small town in central California's San Joaquin Valley, where he attended high school and a community college. He has a younger brother Oren and an older sister Dorrit, both of whom also graduated with university degrees. Geshuri was described in a local newspaper article as loving Porterville and glad to have been raised in a small town, saying "I'm proud of where I'm from." He said that during high school he had already planned to work for a large company, saying he was "interested in how people work and how big corporations work", so he "wanted to work in a big corporation and understand human behavior in the corporate setting".

His wife's name is Rebecca Geshuri. They were married in 1997 or 1998.

== Education ==
Geshuri graduated from Monache High School in 1987, and Porterville College in 1989. He received a bachelor's degree in psychology from the University of California, Irvine, and a master's degree in industrial and organizational psychology from San Jose State University.

== Career and controversies ==
=== E-Trade and earlier career ===
Geshuri was the Vice President of People Operations and Director of Global Staffing at E-Trade Financial Corporation. He also worked at Applied Materials (a major supplier of equipment and services for high-technology manufacturing), was an organizational effectiveness consultant for New United Motors Manufacturing, Inc. (an automobile manufacturing joint venture of General Motors and Toyota that was purchased by Tesla in 2010 to become the Tesla Factory), and in 2002 he co-founded ACI Technical (Analytical and Control Instrumentation Technical Services, a startup company for analysis of water and gas quality based in Edenvale, Gauteng, South Africa).

=== Google and "Do Not Call" non-recruiting policy (2004–09) ===
He was the senior director of human resources and staffing at Google, where he worked from 2004 to 2009 and oversaw all aspects of recruitment. While working at Google, Geshuri was involved in activities that later became the subject of the High-Tech Employee Antitrust Litigation case that resulted in a settlement of $415 million paid by Adobe, Apple, Google and Intel. In one incident, after hearing of a complaint from Steve Jobs of Apple, Geshuri told Google's chairman Eric Schmidt that a recruiter for Google who had tried to hire an Apple employee would be "terminated within the hour" for the action, pursuant to what Schmidt called "a policy of no recruiting from Apple". Geshuri said that such terminations were taking place "every six months or so", despite efforts to make sure recruiters were aware of the policy. Geshuri maintained what he called a "Do Not Call list" of companies Google would avoid recruiting from.

=== Tesla (2009–17) ===
He was the vice president of human resources at Tesla Inc. from November 2009. Geshuri said the company was committed to bringing manufacturing jobs "back to California". In 2015, Geshuri led a hiring spree for Tesla. Geshuri placed an emphasis on hiring military veterans in large numbers. He left Tesla in May 2017, with Tesla saying he would be "taking a short break before moving on to a new endeavor".

He later became Chief People Officer at Livongo Health, retaining the role when they were taken over by Teladoc Health, and was still in that position in late 2023.

=== Wikimedia Foundation (January 2016) ===
Geshuri was appointed to the Wikimedia Foundation's board of trustees in January 2016 for a two-year term. Following controversy among Wikimedia volunteers, including a "no confidence" petition, due to his historical involvement in the collusion over recruiting practices at Silicon Valley corporations that resulted in prosecution by the U.S. Department of Justice and a settlement of $415 million, Geshuri stepped down on 28 January.
