= Thriveworks =

Virtual therapy and counseling company

- Company type: Private
- Industry: Psychotherapy
- Founded: 2008; 18 years ago
- Founder: Anthony Centore
- Headquarters: Virginia, U.S.
- Area served: United States
- Services: Online therapy
- Website: thriveworks.com

Thriveworks is a U.S.-based company that provides in-person and online therapy and psychiatry services. It was founded in 2008 in Cambridge, Massachusetts.

The company has over 330 office locations and employs more than 2,200 clinicians.

== History ==
Thriveworks was founded in 2008.

In February 2022, Will Furness was appointed Chief Executive Officer (CEO)

In November 2022, Thriveworks opened 18 play therapy centers, for children aged 12 and under.

In April 2024, Dan Frogel was appointed Chief Executive Officer.

== Partnerships ==
In July 2022, Thriveworks partnered with the City of Joliet, Illinois to offer mental health services to underinsured and uninsured city residents. The City of Joliet pledged $400,000 in funds to support the program.

In July 2024, outpatient addiction treatment provider, Eleanor Health, and Thriveworks established a partnership to support patients in treatment for substance use disorder in Louisiana, Massachusetts, New Jersey, North Carolina, Ohio, Texas and Washington.

In July 2024, Ophelia, an opioid addiction treatment provider, and Thriveworks partnered to expand patient care for opioid use disorder.

In October 2024, Thriveworks acquired Synchronous Health, a Nashville-based company.

== See also ==
- Telepsychiatry – Mental-health care by telecommunication
- Psychotherapy – Clinically applied psychology for desired behavior change
- Talkspace – American virtual counseling and therapy service company
- BetterHelp – Virtual mental health service
