= The Poacher =

The Poacher may refer to:

- The Poacher (1926 film), a German silent drama film
- The Poacher (1953 film), an Austrian-German drama film
- The Poacher, a song by Ronnie Lane, from Anymore for Anymore

== See also ==
- Poacher (disambiguation)
