= Sanctuary (app) =

Mobile app focusing on astrology and mystical services

- Website type: Private
- Founded: 2019
- Headquarters: New York City, New York, U.S.
- Key people: Ross Clark (CEO)
- Industry: Astrology
- Services: Horoscopes; On-demand astrology readings
- Website: sanctuaryworld.co
- Native clients on: iOS, Android

Sanctuary is a mobile app focusing on astrology and mystical services. Users enter their birthday, time of birth, and place of birth information into the app and receive a birth chart as well as daily horoscope readings. Users can also sign up for a monthly membership and receive on-demand astrological readings via a text message format. The service has been described as being “Talkspace for astrology" and "Uber for astrological readings". The mobile app uses an A.I.-driven interface.

On May 14, 2019, Apple featured Sanctuary as the App of the Day.

== History ==
Sanctuary initially began as project within the incubator of Lorne Michaels’ Broadway Video Ventures. The app officially launched on March 21, 2019. Its backers include Broadway Video Ventures, Greycroft Partners, and Shari Redstone.
