= Parker Dawson =

Parker Dawson may refer to:

- Parker Dawson Poacher
- Parker Dawson 26
- Parker Dawson (Shortland Street)

== See also ==
- Dawaun Parker
