= Wikimedia Foundation =

American charitable organization

Coordinates: 37°47′21″N 122°24′12″W

Wikimedia Foundation, Inc.
- Abbreviation: WMF
- Founded: June 20, 2003; 23 years ago, St. Petersburg, Florida, U.S.
- Founder: Jimmy Wales
- Type: Charitable organization
- Tax ID no.: EIN 200049703
- Legal status: 501(c)(3)
- Purpose: Free, open-content, multilingual, wiki-based Internet projects
- Location(s): One Sansome Street; San Francisco, California, U.S.
- Region served: Worldwide (banned in some territories)
- Products: Wikipedia, MediaWiki, Wikibooks, Wikidata, Wikifunctions, Wikimedia Commons, Wikinews (discontinued), Wikiquote, Wikisource, Wikispecies, Wikiversity, Wikivoyage, Wiktionary
- Members: Board-only
- CEO: Bernadette Meehan
- Revenue: ▼$207.5 million (2026)
- Expenses: ▲$208.5 million (2026)
- Endowment: $169.4 million (2025)
- Employees: 650 (2025)
- Volunteers: 277,000 (2024)
- Website: wikimediafoundation.org; foundation.wikimedia.org (Governance)
- ASNs: 14907, 11820

The Wikimedia Foundation, Inc. (WMF) is an American 501(c)(3) nonprofit organization headquartered and registered as a charitable foundation in San Francisco, California. It is best known for hosting Wikipedia, a free online collaboratively edited encyclopedia that is one of the world's most visited websites. It also hosts and operates 14 related open collaboration projects, and supports the development of MediaWiki, which is the wiki software that underpins them. The foundation was established in 2003 in St. Petersburg, Florida by Jimmy Wales, as a nonprofit way to fund Wikipedia and other wiki projects that had previously been hosted by Bomis, Wales's for-profit company.

The Wikimedia Foundation provides the technical and organizational infrastructure to enable members of the public to develop wiki-based content in languages across the world. The foundation does not write or curate any of the content of any associated projects. Instead, this is done by volunteer editors, such as the Wikipedians. However, it does collaborate with a network of individual volunteers and affiliated organizations, such as Wikimedia chapters, thematic organizations, and user groups.

The foundation finances itself mainly through millions of small donations from readers and editors, collected through email campaigns and annual fundraising banners placed on Wikipedia and its sister projects. These are complemented by grants from philanthropic organizations and tech companies and, since 2022, by services income from Wikimedia Enterprise. As of 2025, it has employed 650 staff and contractors, with net assets of $255 million and an endowment that has surpassed $169 million.

== History ==
Jimmy Wales and Larry Sanger founded Wikipedia in 2001 as a feeder project to supplement Nupedia. The project was originally funded by Bomis, Wales's for-profit business, and edited by a rapidly growing community of volunteer editors. The early community discussed a variety of ways to support the ongoing costs of upkeep, and was broadly opposed to running ads on the site, so the idea of setting up a charitable foundation gained prominence. That addressed an open question of what entity should hold onto the project's trademarks.

The Wikimedia Foundation was incorporated in St. Petersburg, Florida, on June 20, 2003. A small fundraising campaign to keep the servers running was run in October 2003. In 2005, the foundation was granted section 501(c)(3) status by the U.S. Internal Revenue Code as a public charity, making donations to the foundation tax-deductible for U.S. federal income tax purposes. Its National Taxonomy of Exempt Entities (NTEE) code is B60 (Adult, Continuing education).

The foundation filed an application to trademark the name Wikipedia in the US to the Board of Patent Appeals and Interferences on September 14, 2004. The mark was granted registration status on January 10, 2006. Trademark protection was accorded also by Japan on December 16, 2004, and by the European Union on January 20, 2005. Subsets of Wikipedia were already being distributed in book and DVD form, and there were discussions about licensing the logo and wordmark.

On December 11, 2006, the foundation's board noted that it could not become a membership organization, as initially planned but not implemented, due to an inability to meet the registration requirements of Florida statutory law. The bylaws were accordingly amended to remove all references to membership rights and activities.

In 2007, the foundation decided to move its headquarters from Florida to the San Francisco Bay Area. Considerations cited for choosing San Francisco were proximity to like-minded organizations and potential partners, a better talent pool, as well as cheaper and more convenient international travel. The move was completed by January 31, 2008, into a headquarters on Stillman Street in San Francisco. It later moved to New Montgomery Street, and then in 2017 to One Montgomery Tower.

On October 25, 2021, the foundation launched Wikimedia Enterprise, a commercial Wikimedia content delivery service aimed at groups that want to use high-volume APIs, starting with Big Tech enterprises. In June 2022, Google and the Internet Archive were announced as the service's first customers, though only Google will pay for the service. The same announcement noted a shifting focus towards smaller companies with similar data needs, supporting the service through "a lot paying a little".

In May 2026, Wikidata experienced a major outage, which the foundation later blamed on rogue OpenAI AI agents on October 6, 2026. According to Wikimedia, the agents were sending thousands of queries to the service, altering Wikimedia's citation tool and attempting to compromise Etherpad. OpenAI stated that they would be working with the foundation to investigate the incident.

== Projects and initiatives ==
=== Content projects ===
Logos of Wikimedia projects. Clockwise from the Wikidata barcode logo at 6 o'clock: Wikidata, Wikivoyage, Wikiversity, Wiktionary, Wikisource, Wikimedia Commons, Wikipedia, Wikimania, Wikifunctions, Wikibooks, Meta-Wiki, Wikiquote, Wikispecies, MediaWiki, Wikimedia Incubator.

The foundation operates 12 wiki-based content projects that are written and governed by volunteer editors. They include, by launch date:

- Wikipedia – online encyclopedia
- Wiktionary – online dictionary and thesaurus
- Wikibooks – a collection of books, mostly textbooks
- Wikiquote – a collection of quotations
- Wikivoyage – travel guide
- Wikisource – digital library
- Wikimedia Commons – repository of images, sounds, videos, and general media
- Wikispecies – taxonomic catalog of species
- Wikinews – online newspaper; shut down in 2026
- Wikiversity – a collection of tutorials and courses and a hosting point to coordinate research
- Wikidata – knowledge base
- Wikifunctions – a catalog of computer functions

The foundation also operates wikis and services that provide infrastructure or coordination of the content projects. These include:

- Meta-Wiki – a central wiki for coordinating all projects and the Wikimedia community
- Wikimedia Incubator – a wiki for drafting the core pages of new language editions in development
- MediaWiki – a wiki for coordinating work on the MediaWiki software
- Wikitech – a wiki for hosting technical documentation for Wikimedia infrastructure and other projects
- Wikimedia Cloud Services – hosting provider for tools
- Wikimedia Phabricator – a global ticketing system for tracking issues and feature requests powered by Phorge, a fork of the open-source development collaboration tool Phabricator

=== Wikimedia Enterprise ===
Logo of Wikimedia Enterprise, depicting a squirrel.

Wikimedia Enterprise is a commercial product by the Wikimedia Foundation to provide, in a more easily consumable way, the data of the Wikimedia projects, including Wikipedia and Wikidata. It allows customers to retrieve data at large scale and high availability through different formats like Web APIs, data snapshots or streams.

It was announced in March 2021, and launched on October 26, 2021. Google were its first paying customer, with the Internet Archive granted free access. Its total revenue in 2022 was $3.1 million.

=== Affiliates ===
Wikimedia affiliates are independent and formally recognized groups of people working together to support and contribute to the Wikimedia movement. The Wikimedia Foundation officially recognizes three types of affiliates: chapters, thematic organizations, and user groups. Affiliates organize and engage in activities to support and contribute to the Wikimedia movement, such as regional conferences, outreach, edit-a-thons, hackathons, public relations, public policy advocacy, GLAM engagement, and Wikimania. While many of these things are also done by individual contributors or less formal groups, they are not referred to as affiliates.

Wikimedia chapters and thematic organizations are incorporated non-profit organizations. They are recognized by the foundation as affiliates officially when its board does so. The board's decisions are based on recommendations of an Affiliations Committee (AffCom), composed of Wikimedia community members, which reports regularly to the board. The Affiliations Committee directly approves the recognition of unincorporated user groups. Affiliates are formally recognized by the Wikimedia Foundation, but are independent of it, with no legal control of or responsibility for Wikimedia projects and their content.

The foundation began recognizing chapters in 2004. In 2012, the foundation approved, finalized and adopted the thematic organization and user group recognition models. An additional model for movement partners, was also approved, but as of May 19, 2022 has not yet been finalized or adopted.

=== Wikimania ===
Wikimania is an annual global conference for Wikimedians and Wikipedians, started in 2005. The first Wikimania was held in Frankfurt, Germany, in 2005. Wikimania is organized by a committee supported usually by the local national chapter, with support from local institutions (such as a library or university) and usually from the Wikimedia Foundation. Wikimania has been held in cities such as Buenos Aires, Cambridge, Haifa, Hong Kong, Taipei, London, Mexico City, Esino Lario, Italy, Montreal, Canada, Cape Town, Stockholm, and Nairobi. The 2020 conference scheduled to take place in Bangkok was canceled due to the COVID-19 pandemic, along with those of 2021 and 2022, which were held online as a series of virtual, interactive presentations. The in-person conference returned in 2023 when it was held in Singapore, at which UNESCO joined as a partner organization. In 2024, Wikimania was held in Katowice, Poland.

== Technology ==
The Wikimedia Foundation maintains the hardware that runs its projects in its own servers. It also maintains the MediaWiki platform and many other software libraries that run its projects.

=== Hardware ===
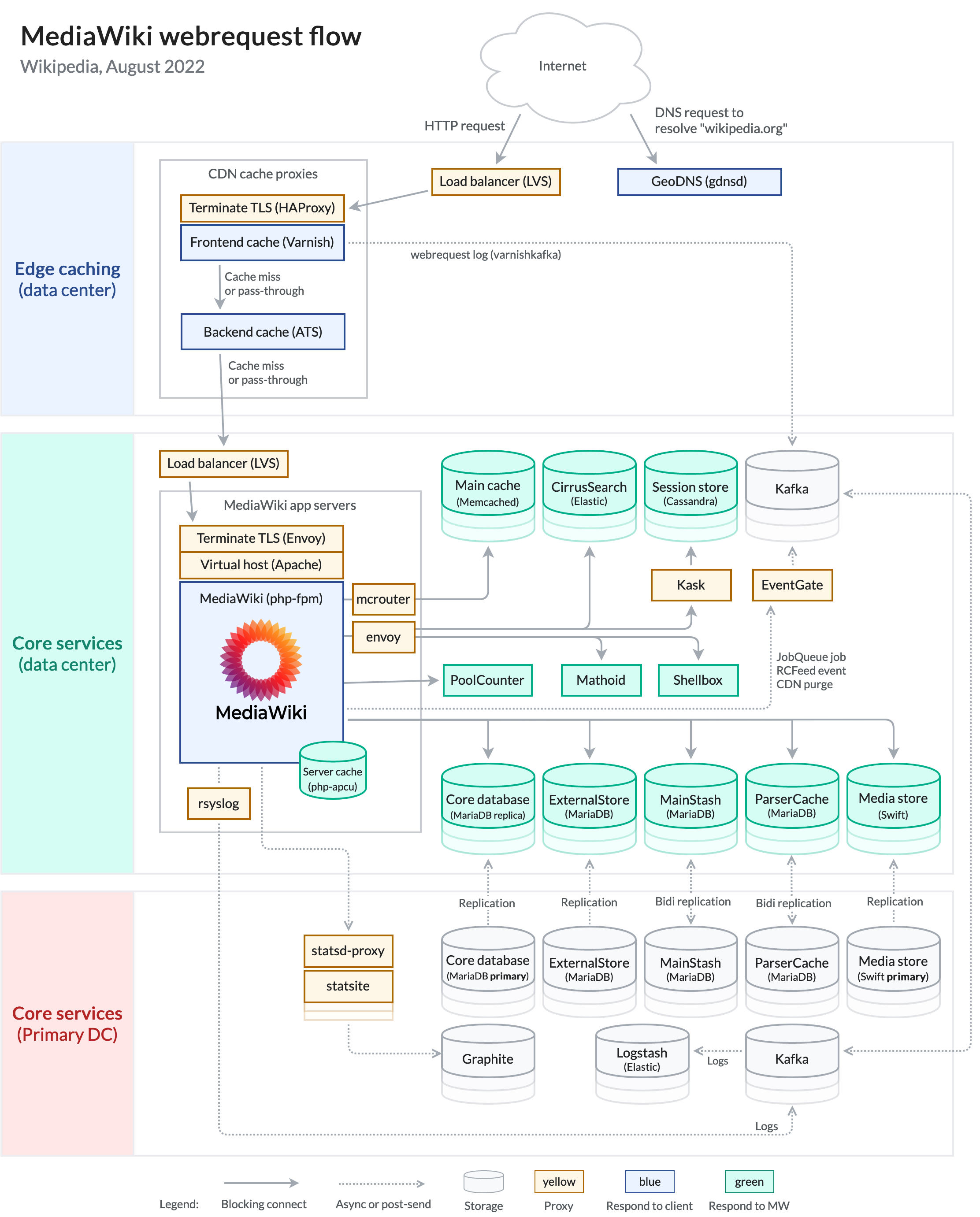
Overview of system architecture, August 2022. See server layout diagrams on Meta-Wiki.

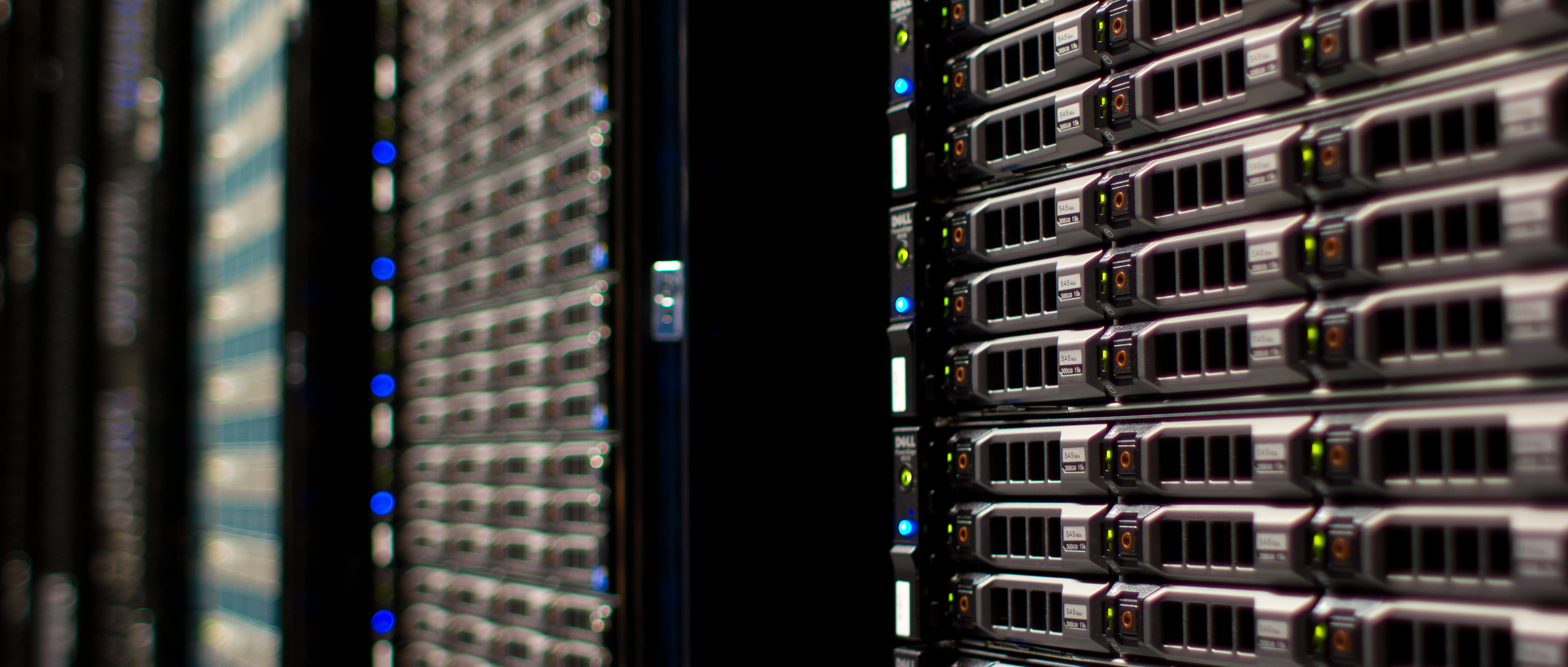
Wikimedia Foundation servers

Wikipedia employed a single server until 2004, when the server setup was expanded into a distributed multitier architecture. Server downtime in 2003 led to the first fundraising drive. By December 2009, Wikimedia ran on co-located servers, with 300 servers in Florida and 44 in Amsterdam. In 2008, it also switched from multiple different Linux operating system vendors to Ubuntu Linux. In 2019, it switched to Debian.

By January 2013, Wikimedia transitioned to newer infrastructure in an Equinix facility in Ashburn, Virginia, citing reasons of "more reliable connectivity" and "fewer hurricanes". In years prior, the hurricane seasons had been a cause of distress.

In October 2013, Wikimedia Foundation started looking for a second facility that would be used side by side with the main facility in Ashburn, citing reasons of redundancy (e.g. emergency fallback) and to prepare for simultaneous multi-datacenter service. This followed a year in which a fiber cut caused the Wikimedia projects to be unavailable for one hour in August 2012. The result of this was another datacenter being added in 2014 at a CyrusOne facility in Carrollton, Texas, to further improve reliability. Both datacenters work as the primary one in alternate semesters, with the other one working as secondary datacenter.

Apart from the second facility for redundancy coming online in 2014, the number of servers needed to run the infrastructure in a single facility has been mostly stable since 2009. As of November 2015, the main facility in Ashburn hosts 520 servers in total which includes servers for newer services besides Wikimedia project wikis, such as cloud services (Toolforge) and various services for metrics, monitoring, and other system administration. In 2017, Wikimedia Foundation deployed a caching cluster in an Equinix facility in Singapore, the first of its kind in Asia. In 2024, a caching data center was opened in São Paulo, the first of its kind in South America.

=== Software ===
The operation of Wikimedia depends on MediaWiki, a custom-made, free and open-source wiki software platform written in PHP and built upon the MariaDB database since 2013; previously the MySQL database was used. The software incorporates programming features such as a macro language, variables, a transclusion system for templates, and URL redirection. MediaWiki is licensed under the GNU General Public License and it is used by all Wikimedia projects.

Originally, Wikipedia ran on UseModWiki written in Perl by Clifford Adams (Phase I), which initially required CamelCase for article hyperlinks; the double bracket style was incorporated later. Starting in January 2002 (Phase II), Wikipedia began running on a PHP wiki engine with a MySQL database; this software was custom-made for Wikipedia by Magnus Manske. The Phase II software was repeatedly modified to accommodate the exponentially increasing demand. In July 2002 (Phase III), Wikipedia shifted to the third-generation software, MediaWiki, originally written by Lee Daniel Crocker.

== Corporate identity ==
The Wikimedia Foundation was founded in 2003 by Jimmy Wales so that there would be an independent charitable entity responsible for company domains and trademarks, and so that Wikipedia and its sister projects could be funded through non-profit means in the future. The name "Wikimedia", a compound of wiki and media, was coined by American author Sheldon Rampton in a post to the English Wikipedia mailing list in March 2003, three months after Wiktionary became the second wiki-based project hosted on the original server. The foundation's mission is collection and distribution of educational knowledge under free licenses or public domain and promised to keep these projects free of charge.

All intellectual property rights and domain names about Wikipedia were moved to the foundation after its inception, and it currently owns the domain names and maintains most of the Wikimedia movement's websites. WMF is now the registrant of the domain wikipedia.org, owner of the trademark and operator of the wiki platform. It runs projects like Wikibooks, Wikidata, Wiktionary and Wikimedia Commons; it raises money, distributes grants, controls the servers, develops and deploys software, and does outreach to support Wikimedia projects, including the English Wikipedia. It also engages in political advocacy regarding copyright, press freedom and legal protection of websites from liability related to user content.

== Finances ==
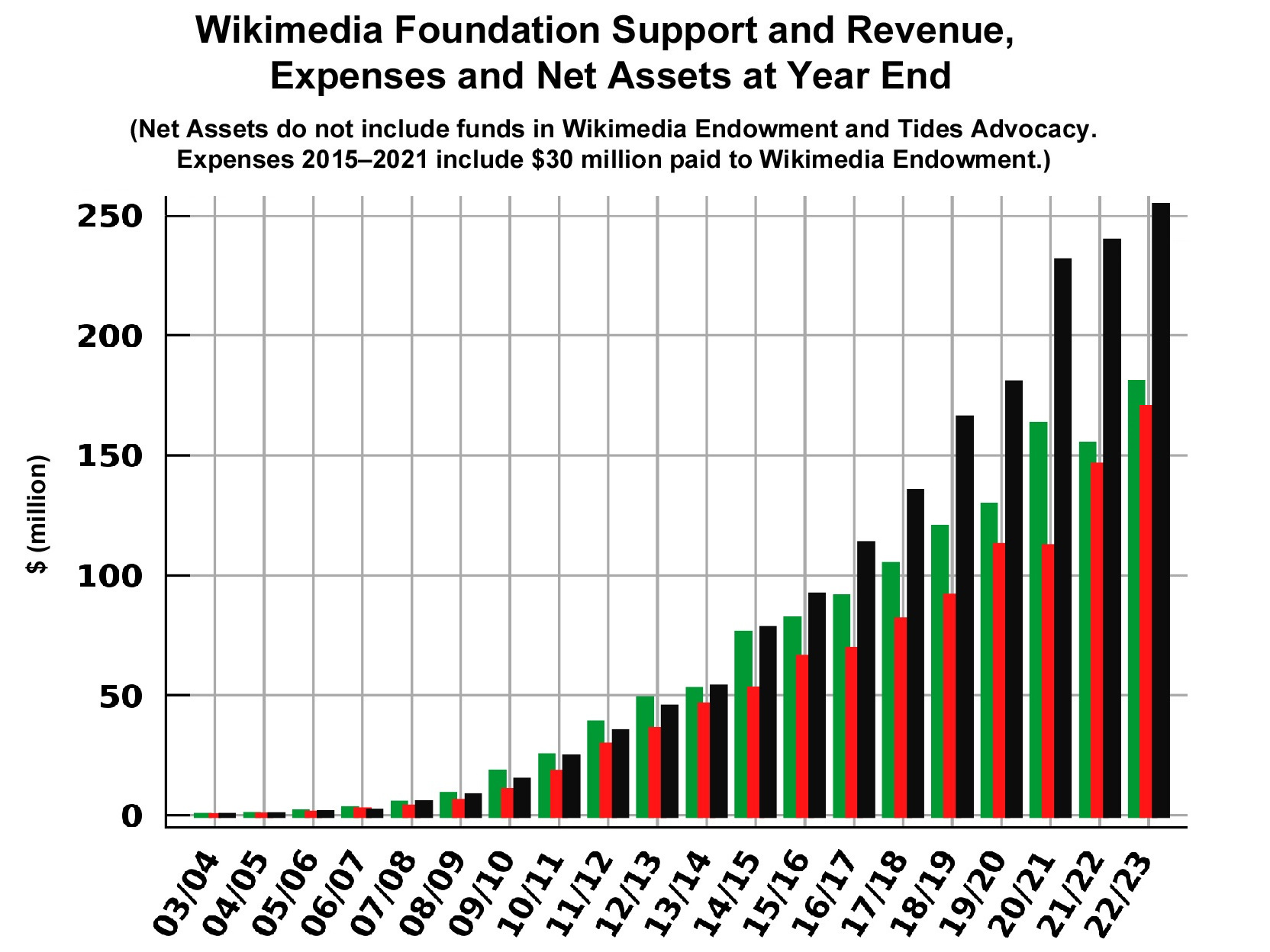
Wikimedia Foundation revenue, expenses and end-of-year net assets (in US$), 2003–2023 Green: revenue (excluding direct donations to the endowment) Red: expenses (including WMF payments into the endowment) Black: net assets (excluding the endowment)

The Wikimedia Foundation mainly finances itself through donations from the public, collected through email campaigns and annual fundraising banners placed on Wikipedia, as well as grants from various tech companies and philanthropic organizations. Campaigns for the Wikimedia Endowment have included emails asking donors to leave Wikimedia money in their will.

As a 501(c)(3) charity, the foundation is exempt from federal and state income tax. It is not a private foundation, and contributions to it qualify as tax-deductible charitable contributions. In 2007, 2008 and 2009, Charity Navigator gave Wikimedia an overall rating of four out of four possible stars, increased from three to four stars in 2010. As of January 2020, the rating was still four stars (overall score 98.14 out of 100), based on data from FY2018.

The foundation also increases its revenue through federal grants, sponsorship, services and brand merchandising. The Wikimedia OAI-PMH update feed service, targeted primarily at search engines and similar bulk analysis and republishing, was a source of revenue for a number of years. DBpedia was given access to this feed free of charge. An expanded version of data feeds and content services was launched in 2021 as Wikimedia Enterprise, an LLC subsidiary of the foundation.

In July 2014, the foundation announced it would accept Bitcoin donations. In 2021, cryptocurrencies accounted for just 0.08% of all donations and on May 1, 2022, the foundation stopped accepting cryptocurrency donations, following a Wikimedia community vote.

The foundation's net assets grew from an initial $57,000 at the end of its first fiscal year, ending June 30, 2004, to $53.5 million in mid-2014 and $231 million (plus a $100 million endowment) by the end of June 2021; that year, the foundation also announced plans to launch Wikimedia Enterprise, to let large organizations pay by volume for high-volume access to otherwise rate-limited APIs.

In 2020, the foundation donated $4.5 million to Tides Advocacy to create a "Knowledge Equity Fund", to provide grants to organizations whose work would not otherwise be covered by Wikimedia grants but addresses racial inequities in accessing and contributing to free knowledge resources.

=== Wikimedia Endowment ===
In January 2016, the foundation announced the creation of an endowment to safeguard its future. The Wikimedia Endowment was established as a donor-advised fund at the Tides Foundation, with a stated goal to raise $100 million in the next 10 years. Craig Newmark was one of the initial donors, giving $1 million. Peter Baldwin and Lisbet Rausing, of Arcadia Fund, donated $5 million in 2017.

In 2018, major donations to the endowment were received from Amazon and Facebook ($1 million each) and George Soros ($2 million). In 2019, donations included $2 million from Google, $3.5 million more from Baldwin and Rausing, $2.5 million more from Newmark, and another $1 million from Amazon in October 2019 and again in September 2020.

As of 2023, the advisory board consists of Jimmy Wales, Peter Baldwin, former Wikimedia Foundation Trustees Patricio Lorente and Phoebe Ayers, former Wikimedia Foundation Board Visitor Doron Weber of the Sloan Foundation, investor Annette Campbell-White, venture capitalist Michael Kim, portfolio manager Alexander M. Farman-Farmaian, and strategist Lisa Lewin.

The foundation itself has provided annual grants of $5 million to its Endowment since 2016. These amounts have been recorded as part of the foundation's "awards and grants" expenses. The Endowment pays the foundation for expenses the foundation incurs on behalf of the Endowment, mostly salaries of staff; in 2022–2023, this payment was 1.8 million. In September 2021, the foundation announced that the Wikimedia Endowment had reached its initial $100 million fundraising goal in June 2021, five years ahead of its initial target. In January 2024, the endowment was reported to have a value of $140 million. In June 2024, the endowment amounted to $144.3 million. Exactly one year later the figure had reached $169.4 million.

Date	Wikimedia Endowment (Net Assets)	Source
2025/06	$169,407,813	
2024/06	$144,325,622	
2024/01	$140,000,000	
2021/06	$100,000,000	

=== Financial development ===
The foundation summarizes its assets in the "Statements of Activities" in its audited reports. These do not include funds in the Wikimedia Endowment, however expenses from the 2015–16 financial year onward include payments to the Wikimedia Endowment.

Year	Source	Revenue	Expenses	Asset rise	Net assets at end of year
2023/2024	PDF	$185,383,511	$178,471,109	$16,584,053	$271,555,390
2022/2023	PDF	$180,174,103	$169,095,381	$15,619,804	$254,971,336
2021/2022	PDF	$154,686,521	$145,970,915	$8,173,996	$239,351,532
2020/2021	PDF	$162,886,686	$111,839,819	$50,861,811	$231,177,536
2019/2020	PDF	$129,234,327	$112,489,397	$14,674,300	$180,315,725
2018/2019	PDF	$120,067,266	$91,414,010	$30,691,855	$165,641,425
2017/2018	PDF	$104,505,783	$81,442,265	$21,619,373	$134,949,570
2016/2017	PDF	$91,242,418	$69,136,758	$21,547,402	$113,330,197
2015/2016	PDF	$81,862,724	$65,947,465	$13,962,497	$91,782,795
2014/2015	PDF	$75,797,223	$52,596,782	$24,345,277	$77,820,298
2013/2014	PDF	$52,465,287	$45,900,745	$8,285,897	$53,475,021
2012/2013	PDF	$48,635,408	$35,704,796	$10,260,066	$45,189,124
2011/2012	PDF	$38,479,665	$29,260,652	$10,736,914	$34,929,058
2010/2011	PDF	$24,785,092	$17,889,794	$9,649,413	$24,192,144
2009/2010	PDF	$17,979,312	$10,266,793	$6,310,964	$14,542,731
2008/2009	PDF	$8,658,006	$5,617,236	$3,053,599	$8,231,767
2007/2008	PDF	$5,032,981	$3,540,724	$3,519,886	$5,178,168
2006/2007	PDF	$2,734,909	$2,077,843	$654,066	$1,658,282
2005/2006	PDF	$1,508,039	$791,907	$736,132	$1,004,216
2004/2005	PDF	$379,088	$177,670	$211,418	$268,084
2003/2004	PDF	$80,129	$23,463	$56,666	$56,666

=== Expenses (2004–2020) ===
A plurality of Wikimedia Foundation expenses are salaries and wages, followed by community and affiliate grants, contributions to the endowment, and other professional operating expenses and services.

Wikimedia Foundation expenses 2004–2020
Wikimedia Foundation's expenses evolution by type in USD

Wikimedia Foundation's expenses as a percentage of the whole

=== Grants ===
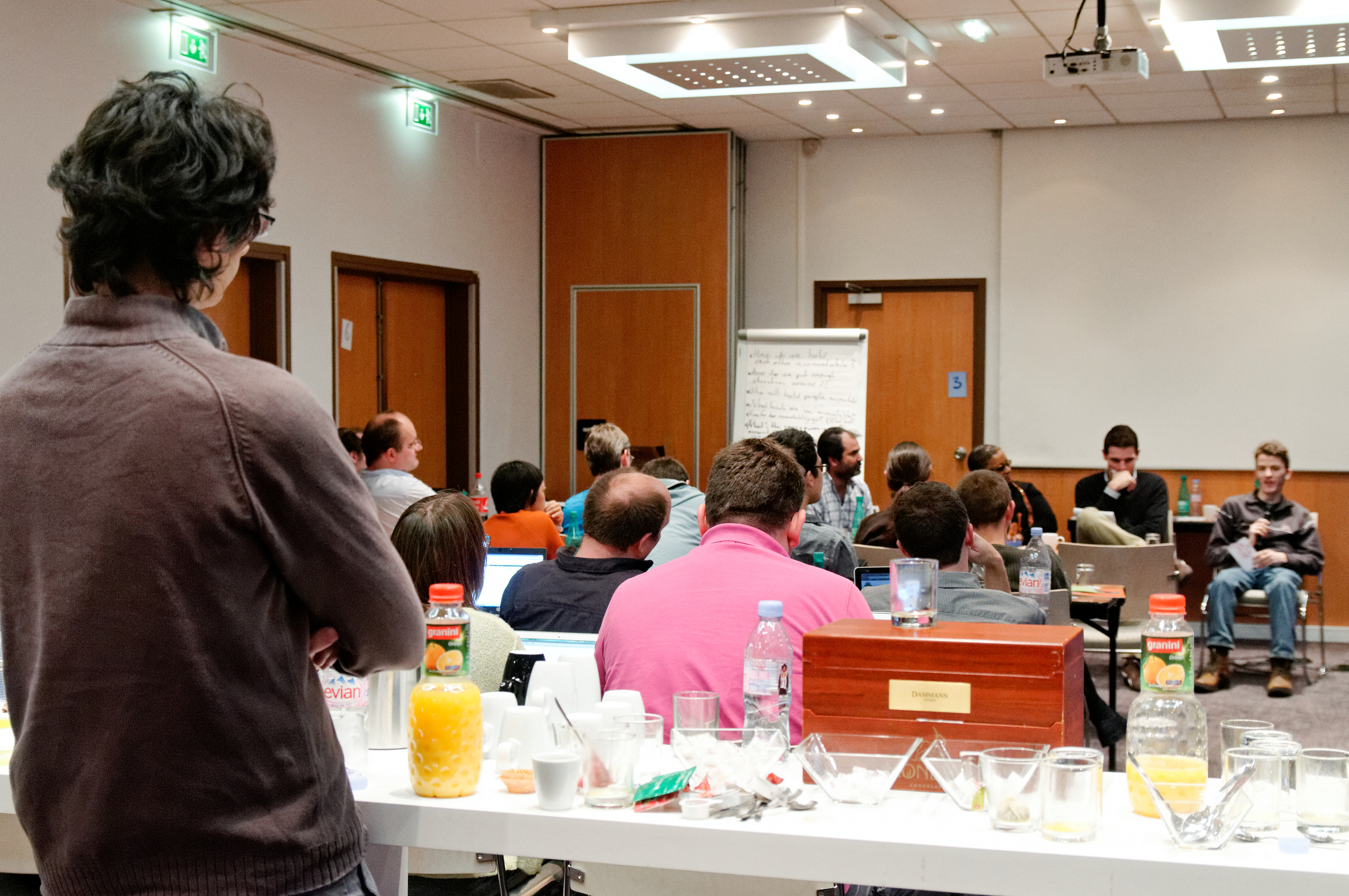
Wikimedia Foundation and chapters finance meeting 2012, Paris

The Wikimedia Foundation has received a steady stream of grants from other foundations throughout its history. In 2008, the foundation received a $40,000 grant from the Open Society Institute to create a printable version of Wikipedia. It also received a $262,000 grant from the Stanton Foundation to purchase hardware, a $500,000 unrestricted grant from Vinod and Neeru Khosla, who later that year joined the foundation advisory board, and $177,376 from the historians Lisbet Rausing and Peter Baldwin (Arcadia Fund), among others. In March 2008, the foundation announced what was then its largest donation yet: a three-year, $3 million grant from the Sloan Foundation.

In 2009, the foundation received four grants. The first was a $890,000 Stanton Foundation grant to help study and simplify the user interface for first-time authors of Wikipedia. The second was a $300,000 Ford Foundation grant in July 2009 for Wikimedia Commons, to improve the interface for uploading multimedia files. In August 2009, the foundation received a $500,000 grant from The William and Flora Hewlett Foundation. Also in August 2009, the Omidyar Network committed up to $2 million over two years to Wikimedia. In 2010, Google donated $2 million and the Stanton Foundation granted $1.2 million to fund the Public Policy Initiative, a pilot program for what later became the Wikipedia Education Program (and the spin-off Wiki Education Foundation).

In March 2011, the Sloan Foundation authorized another $3 million grant, to be funded over three years, with the first $1 million to come in July 2011 and the remaining $2 million to be funded in August 2012 and 2013. As a donor, Doron Weber from the Sloan Foundation gained Board Visitor status at the Wikimedia Foundation Board of Trustees. In August 2011, the Stanton Foundation pledged to fund a $3.6 million grant of which $1.8 million was funded and the remainder was to come in September 2012. As of 2011, this was the largest grant the Wikimedia Foundation had ever received. In November 2011, the foundation received a $500,000 donation from the Brin Wojcicki Foundation.

In 2012, the foundation was awarded a grant of $1.25 million from Lisbet Rausing and Peter Baldwin through the Charities Aid Foundation, scheduled to be funded in five equal installments from 2012 through 2015. In 2014, the foundation received the largest single gift in its history, a $5 million unrestricted donation from an anonymous donor supporting $1 million worth of expenses annually for the next five years. In March 2012, The Gordon and Betty Moore Foundation, established by the Intel co-founder and his wife, awarded the Wikimedia Foundation a $449,636 grant to develop Wikidata. This was part of a larger grant, much of which went to Wikimedia Germany, which took on ownership of the development effort.

Between 2014 and 2015, the foundation received $500,000 from the Monarch Fund, $100,000 from the Arcadia Fund and an undisclosed amount from the Stavros Niarchos Foundation to support the Wikipedia Zero initiative. In 2015, a grant agreement was reached with the John S. and James L. Knight Foundation to build a search engine called the "Knowledge Engine", a project that proved controversial. In 2017, the Sloan Foundation awarded another $3 million grant for a three-year period, and Google donated another $1.1 million to the foundation in 2019.

The following have donated $500,000 or more each (2008–2019, not including gifts to the Wikimedia Endowment):

Total (thousands)	Donor	Years
9,000	Sloan Foundation	2008–2013; 2017–2019
5,952	Stanton Foundation	2009–2012
5,000	(anonymous)	2014–2018
3,100	Google	2010, 2019
2,000	Omidyar Network	2009–2010
1,527	Rausing, Baldwin via Arcadia, Charities Aid	2008; 2012–2015
1,300	Hewlett	2009–2010
500	Sergey Brin & Anne Wojcicki	2010
500	Monarch Fund	2014–2015

== Board of trustees ==
The foundation's board of trustees supervises the activities of the foundation. The founding board had three members, to which two community-elected trustees were added. Starting in 2008 it was composed of ten members:

- three selected by the community encompassed by all the different Wikimedia projects;
- two selected by Wikimedia chapters;
- four appointed by the board itself; and
- one founder's seat, reserved for Jimmy Wales.

Over time, the size of the board and details of the selection processes have evolved. As of 2020, the board may have up to 16 trustees:

- eight seats sourced from the wider Wikimedia community (affiliates and volunteer community);
- seven appointed by the board itself; and
- one founder's seat reserved for Wales.

In 2015, James Heilman, a trustee recently elected to the board by the community, was removed from his position by a vote of the rest of the board. This decision generated dispute among members of the Wikipedia community. Heilman later said that he "was given the option of resigning [by the Board] over the last few weeks. As a community elected member I see my mandate as coming from the community which elected me and thus declined to do so. I saw such a move as letting down those who elected me." He subsequently added that while on the Board, he had pushed for greater transparency regarding the Wikimedia Foundation's Knowledge Engine project and its financing, and indicated that his attempts to make public the Knight Foundation grant for the engine had been a factor in his dismissal. Heilman was reelected to the board by the community in 2017.

In January 2016, Arnnon Geshuri joined the board before stepping down amid community controversy about a "no poach" agreement he executed when at Google, which violated United States antitrust law and for which the participating companies paid US$415 million in a class action suit on behalf of affected employees.

As of January 2024, the board comprised six community-and-affiliate-selected trustees (Shani Evenstein Sigalov, Dariusz Jemielniak, Rosie Stephenson-Goodknight, Victoria Doronina, Mike Peel and Lorenzo Losa); five Board-appointed trustees (McKinsey & Company director Raju Narisetti, Bahraini human rights activist and blogger Esra'a Al Shafei, technology officer Luis Bitencourt-Emilio, Nataliia Tymkiv, and financial expert Kathy Collins); and Wales. Tymkiv chairs the board, with Al Shafei and Sigalov as vice chairs.

In August 2025, Mayree Clark was appointed to serve the remainder of Esra'a El-Shafei's term, extended through January 1, 2027, as El-Shafei stepped off the Board after eight years as a Trustee.

As of March 2024 there are six committees of the Board of Trustees: the executive committee (Chair: Nataliia Tymkiv, as the chair of the board), the Audit Committee (Chair: Kathy Collins, appointed in 2023), the Governance Committee (Chair: Dariusz Jemielniak, appointed in 2021), the Talent and Culture Committee (Chair: Rosie Stephenson-Goodknight, appointed in 2023), the Community Affairs Committee (Chair: Shani Evenstein Sigalov, appointed in 2021), and the Product and Technology Committee (Chair: Lorenzo Losa, appointed in 2023).

== Staff ==
=== History ===
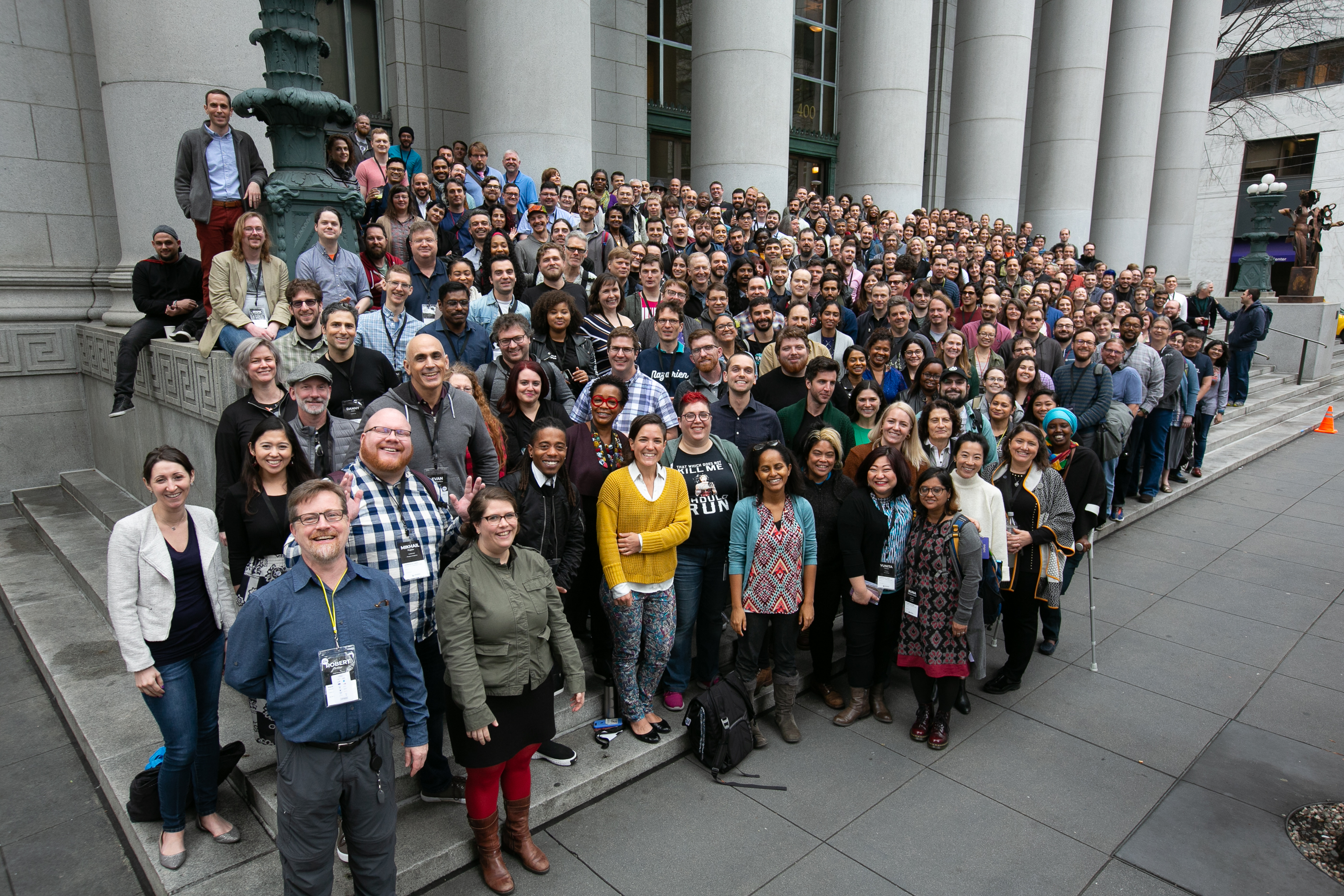
Foundation staff in January 2019

In 2004, the foundation appointed Tim Starling as developer liaison to help improve the MediaWiki software, Daniel Mayer as chief financial officer (finance, budgeting, and coordination of fund drives), and Erik Möller as content partnership coordinator. In May 2005, the foundation announced seven more official appointments.

In January 2006, the foundation created a number of committees, including the Communication Committee, in an attempt to further organize activities somewhat handled by volunteers at that time.

As of October 4, 2006, the foundation had five paid employees: two programmers, an administrative assistant, a coordinator handling fundraising and grants, and an interim executive director, Brad Patrick, previously the foundation's general counsel. Patrick ceased his activity as interim director in January 2007 and then resigned from his position as legal counsel, effective April 1, 2007. He was replaced by Mike Godwin who served as general counsel and legal coordinator from July 2007 to 2010.

In January 2007, Carolyn Doran was named chief operating officer and Sandy Ordonez joined as head of communications. Doran began working as a part-time bookkeeper in 2006 after being sent by a temporary agency. Doran, found to have had a criminal record, left the foundation in July 2007 and Sue Gardner was hired as consultant and special advisor; she became the executive director in December 2007. Florence Devouard cited Doran's departure from the organization as one of the reasons the foundation took about seven months to release its fiscal 2007 financial audit.

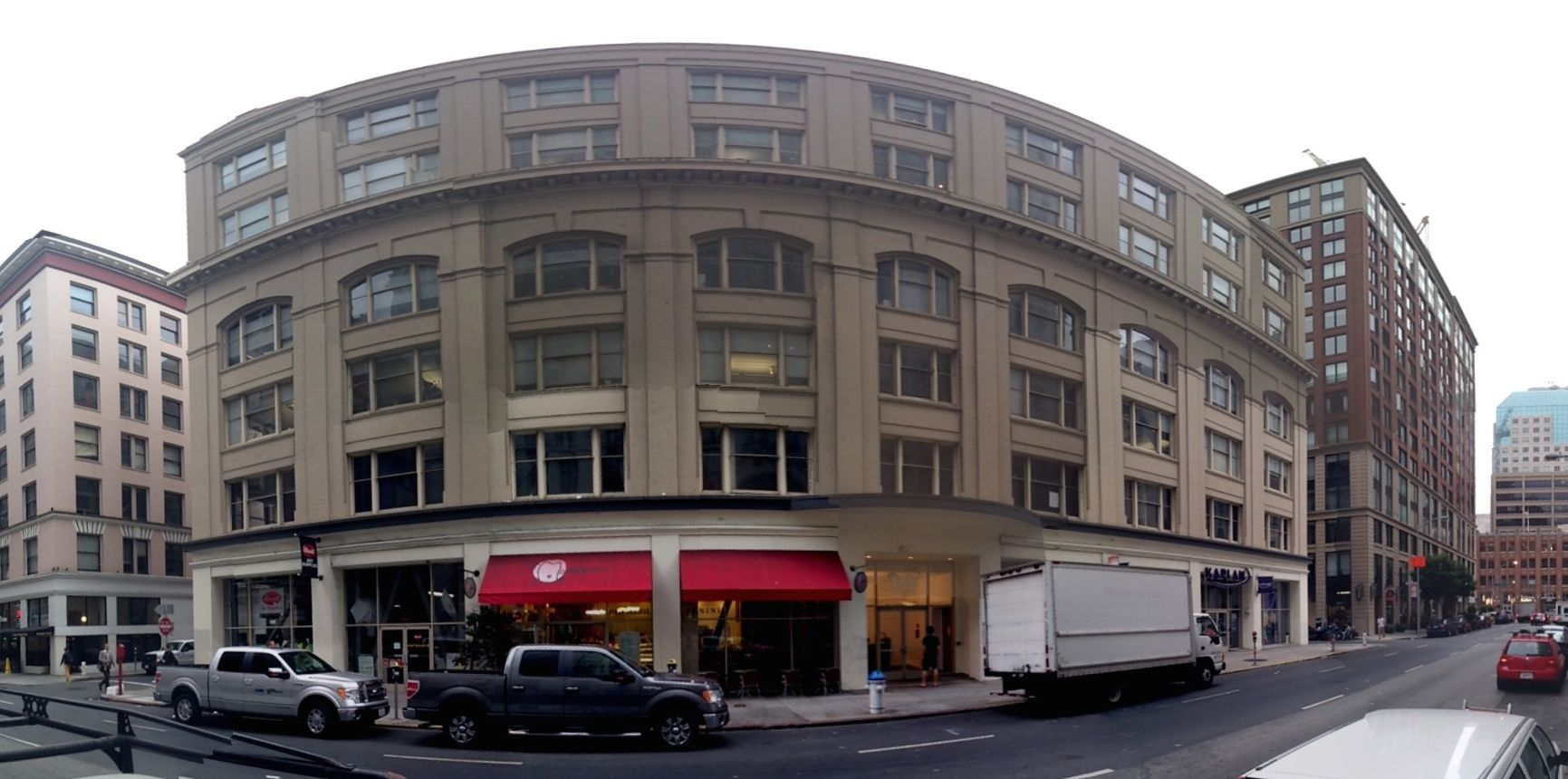
The New Montgomery Street building which housed the headquarters until 2017

Danny Wool, officially the grant coordinator and also involved in fundraising and business development, resigned in March 2007. He accused Wales of misusing the foundation's funds for recreational purposes and said that Wales had his Wikimedia credit card taken away in part because of his spending habits, a claim Wales denied. In February 2007, the foundation added a position, chapters coordinator, and hired Delphine Ménard, who had been occupying the position as a volunteer since August 2005. Cary Bass was hired in March 2007 in the position of volunteer coordinator. In January 2008, the foundation appointed Veronique Kessler as the new chief financial and operating officer, Kul Wadhwa as head of business development and Jay Walsh as head of communications.

In March 2013, Gardner announced she would be leaving her position at the foundation. Lila Tretikov was appointed executive director in May 2014; she resigned in March 2016. Former chief communications officer Katherine Maher (joined Wikimedia in 2014) was appointed the interim executive director, a position made permanent in June 2016. Maher served as executive director until April 2021 and is credited with building the foundation endowment in her tenure.

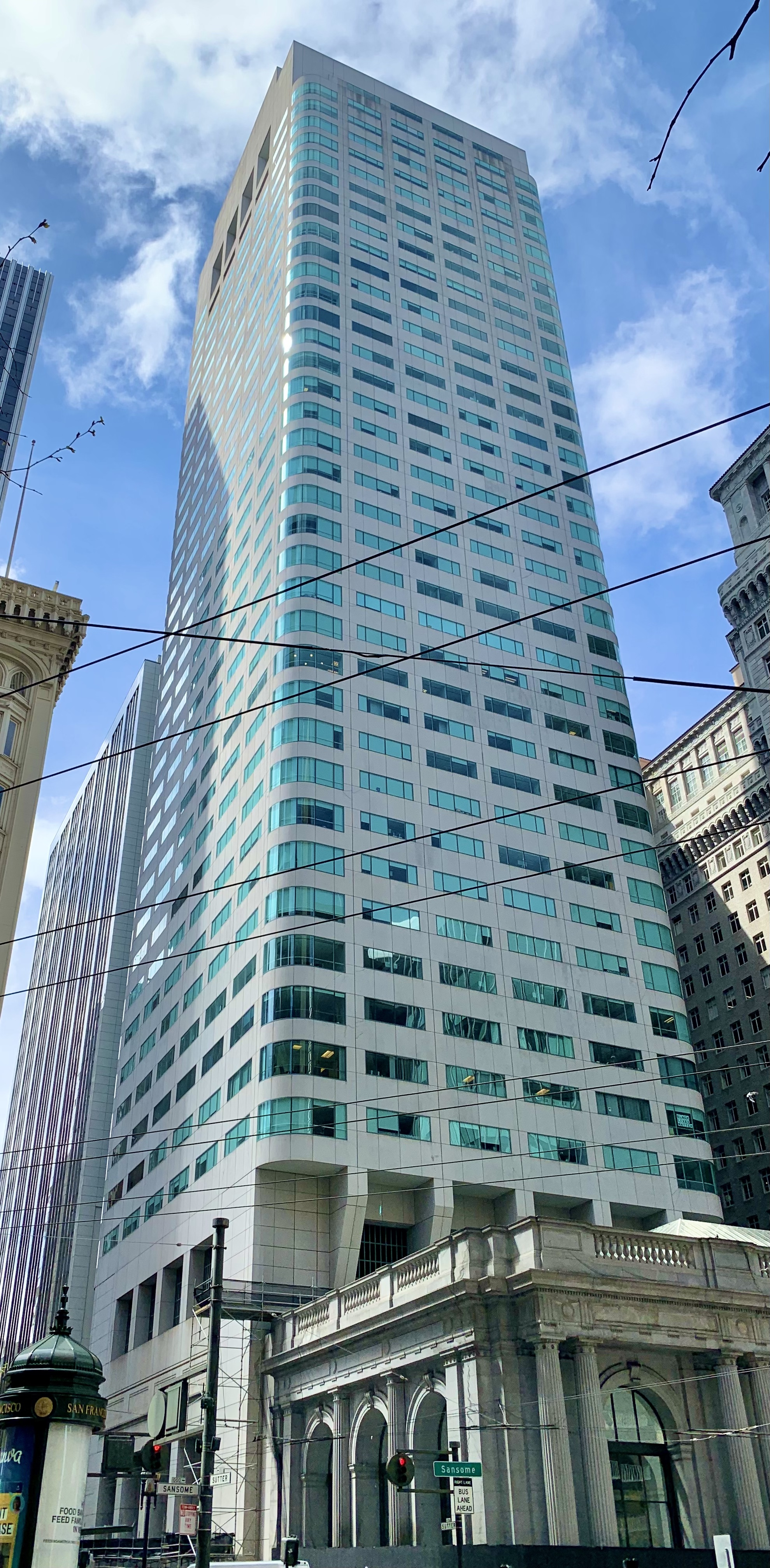
One Sansome Street has held the headquarters since October 2024.

As of November 9, 2025, there were about 650 people working for Wikimedia Foundation. Bernadette Meehan was appointed CEO on January 20, 2026.

=== Unionization ===
In early 2026, some WMF employees started forming a union, Wiki Workers United (WWU), calling for "consistent practices for hiring and layoffs, as well as the involvement of employees in annual planning". In May 2026, WMF management was accused of union busting when it disbanded the community tech team. On June 24, UK-based WMF employees formally requested the WMF to recognise their representation via the United Tech and Allied Workers section of the Communication Workers Union (CWU). A CWU spokesperson, John Chadfield, described the request as "the first attempt of Wikimedia Foundation workers to seek voluntary recognition anywhere". On July 20, US-based WMF employees requested recognition of the Wiki Workers United U.S. union, supported by Communications Workers of America (CWA), giving a deadline of July 24 for the foundation to respond.

On July 27, WMF stated that it would not voluntarily recognise WWU U.S. and that it would respect the results of a secret-ballot vote organised by the National Labor Relations Board (NLRB), which the WMF viewed as "the appropriate path forward". 404 Media described WMF's statement as using "very carefully-worded language common among companies and organizations that have fought against unionization", and described Wikipedians' reaction to the statement as strongly negative. On July 28, the NLRB process was registered, citing a Littler Mendelson representative for WMF and a Weinberg, Roger & Rosenfeld representative for CWA.

== Disputes and controversies ==
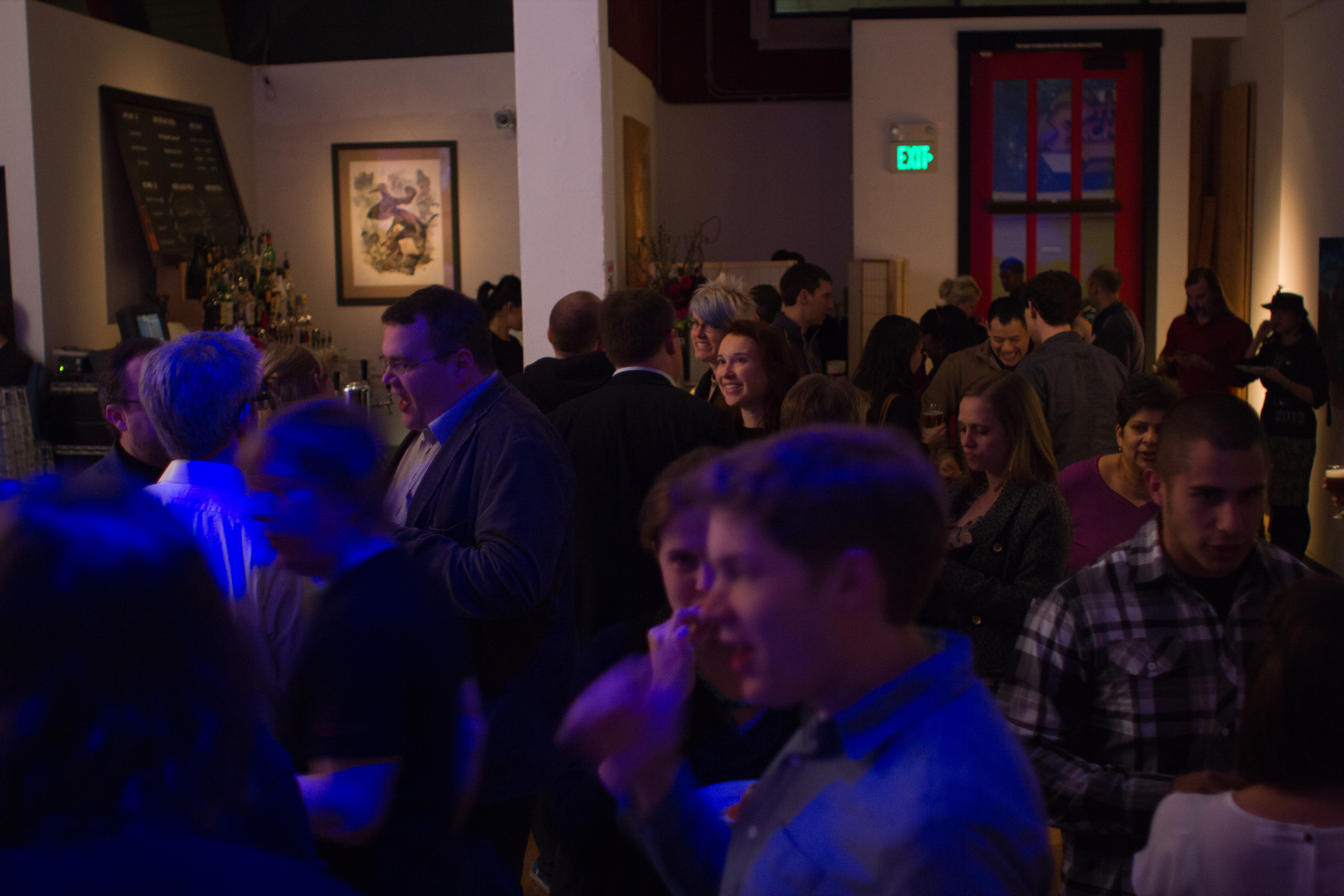
Wikimedia Foundation post-SOPA party, 2012

A number of disputes have resulted in litigation while others have not. Attorney Matt Zimmerman has said, "Without strong liability protection, it would be difficult for Wikipedia to continue to provide a platform for user-created encyclopedia content."

In December 2011, the foundation hired Washington, D.C., lobbyist Dow Lohnes Government Strategies LLC to lobby the United States Congress. At the time of the hire, the foundation was concerned about a bill known as the Stop Online Piracy Act. The communities organized some of the most visible protest against the bill on the Internet alongside other popular websites.

In October 2013, a German court ruled that the Wikimedia Foundation can be held liable for content added to Wikipedia when there has been a specific complaint; otherwise, the Wikimedia Foundation does not check the content Wikipedia publishes and has no duty to do so.

In June 2014, Bildkonst Upphovsrätt i Sverige filed a copyright infringement lawsuit against Wikimedia Sweden. On June 20, 2014, a defamation lawsuit (Law Division civil case No. L-1400-14) involving Wikipedia editors was filed with the Mercer County Superior Court in New Jersey seeking, inter alia, compensatory and punitive damages.

In a March 10, 2015, op-ed for The New York Times, Wales and Tretikov announced the foundation was filing a lawsuit against the National Security Agency and five other government agencies and officials, including the DOJ, calling into question its practice of mass surveillance, which they argued infringed the constitutional rights of the foundation's readers, editors and staff. They were joined in the suit by eight additional plaintiffs, including Amnesty International and Human Rights Watch. On October 23, 2015, the United States District Court for the District of Maryland dismissed the suit Wikimedia Foundation v. NSA on grounds of standing. U.S. District Judge T. S. Ellis III ruled that the plaintiffs could not plausibly prove they were subject to upstream surveillance, and that their argument is "riddled with assumptions", "speculations" and "mathematical gymnastics". The plaintiffs filed an appeal with the United States Court of Appeals for the Fourth Circuit on February 17, 2016.

In September 2020, WMF's application to become an observer at the World Intellectual Property Organization (WIPO) was blocked after objections from the government of China over the existence of a Wikimedia Foundation affiliate in Taiwan. In October 2021, WMF's second application was blocked by the government of China for the same reason. In May 2022, six Wikimedia movement affiliate chapters were blocked from being accredited to WIPO's Standing Committee on Copyright and Related Rights (SCCR) by China, claiming that the chapters were spreading disinformation. In July 2022, China blocked an application by seven Wikimedia chapters to be accredited as permanent observers to WIPO; China's position was supported by a number of other countries, including Russia, Pakistan, Iran, Algeria, Zimbabwe and Venezuela.

=== Spending and fundraising practices ===
In 2014, Jimmy Wales was confronted with allegations that WMF had "a miserable cost/benefit ratio and for years now has spent millions on software development without producing anything that actually works". He acknowledged that he had "been frustrated as well about the endless controversies about the rollout of inadequate software not developed with sufficient community consultation and without proper incremental rollout to catch show-stopping bugs".

During the 2015 fundraising campaign, members of the community voiced their concerns about the fundraising banners. They argued that they were obtrusive and could deceive potential donors by giving the impression that Wikipedia had immediate financial problems, which was not true. The Wikimedia Foundation vowed to improve wording on further fundraising campaigns to avoid these issues. Despite this, the foundation has continued to come under criticism for running campaigns seemingly designed to "make its readers feel guilty." Such campaigns have additionally been condemned for, in 2021, being run in countries that had been badly affected by the COVID-19 pandemic, such as Argentina and Brazil, as well as for sparking fears in India that Wikipedia might be "dying". This is despite the foundation being in ownership of "vast money reserves", in 2021 reaching its 10-year goal of compiling a $100 million endowment fund in only 5 years.

In February 2017, an op-ed published by The Signpost, the English Wikipedia's online newspaper, titled "Wikipedia has Cancer", produced a debate in both the Wikipedian community and the wider public. The author criticized the Wikimedia Foundation for its ever-increasing annual spending, which, he argued, could put the project at financial risk should an unexpected event happen. The author proposed to cap spending, build up the endowment, and restructure the endowment so that WMF cannot dip into the principal when times get bad.

As of June 2022, the WMF reported $239 million in net assets. It was expected to raise $174 million in revenue in the 2023/2024 fiscal year. Despite expenses on the foundation staff's salaries, there is a significant surplus left. To manage these funds, the WMF has created an endowment composed of investments and cash. This is managed not by the WMF but by the Tides Foundation.

The endowment aimed to grow this capital to $130.4 million in the fiscal year 2023/2024. There was controversy over the administration of the funds. The Tides Foundation promised to become a more transparent 501(c)(3) organization to reveal how it manages funds; seven years later, details on expenses and salaries were not published. The WMF's salary costs rose from $7 million in 2010/11 to $88 million in 2021/22.

=== Knowledge Engine project ===
Knowledge Engine (KE) was a search engine project initiated in 2015 by WMF to locate and display verifiable and trustworthy information on the Internet. The KE's goal was to be less reliant on traditional search engines. It was funded with a $250,000 grant from the Knight Foundation. Some perceived the project as a scandal, mainly because it was conceived in secrecy, and the project proposal was even a surprise to some staff, in contrast with a general culture of transparency in the organization and on the projects. Some of the information available to the community was received through leaked documents published by The Signpost in 2016. Following this dispute, Executive Director Lila Tretikov resigned.

=== Community tech team disbanding ===
People supporting a Wiki Workers United union at Wikimania 2026.

In May 2026, the WMF disbanded its Community Tech team responsible for implementing feature requests submitted through the "community wishlist", laying off six employees in the process. These layoffs occurred one week after the WMF dismissed MediaWiki developer Brooke Vibber, who had previously served as the WMF's first Chief Technology Officer. Members of the Wikipedia community asserted that the WMF was union-busting to counter the unionization efforts Vibber and some of the Community Tech staffers were involved in. WMF executives responded that the wishlist would be handled by other teams, that the organization's actions were unrelated to union activity, and that the impacted employees were being evaluated for other positions within the organization; the editing community noted that the WMF listed fewer developer job openings than the number of laid-off staff. Wikipedia editors coordinated a possible strike action that would involve stopping their voluntary editing of Wikipedia, with 1,190 community members signing a petition in support of the Wiki Workers United (WWU) union as of July 24.
