= One Sansome Street =

Skyscraper in San Francisco, California

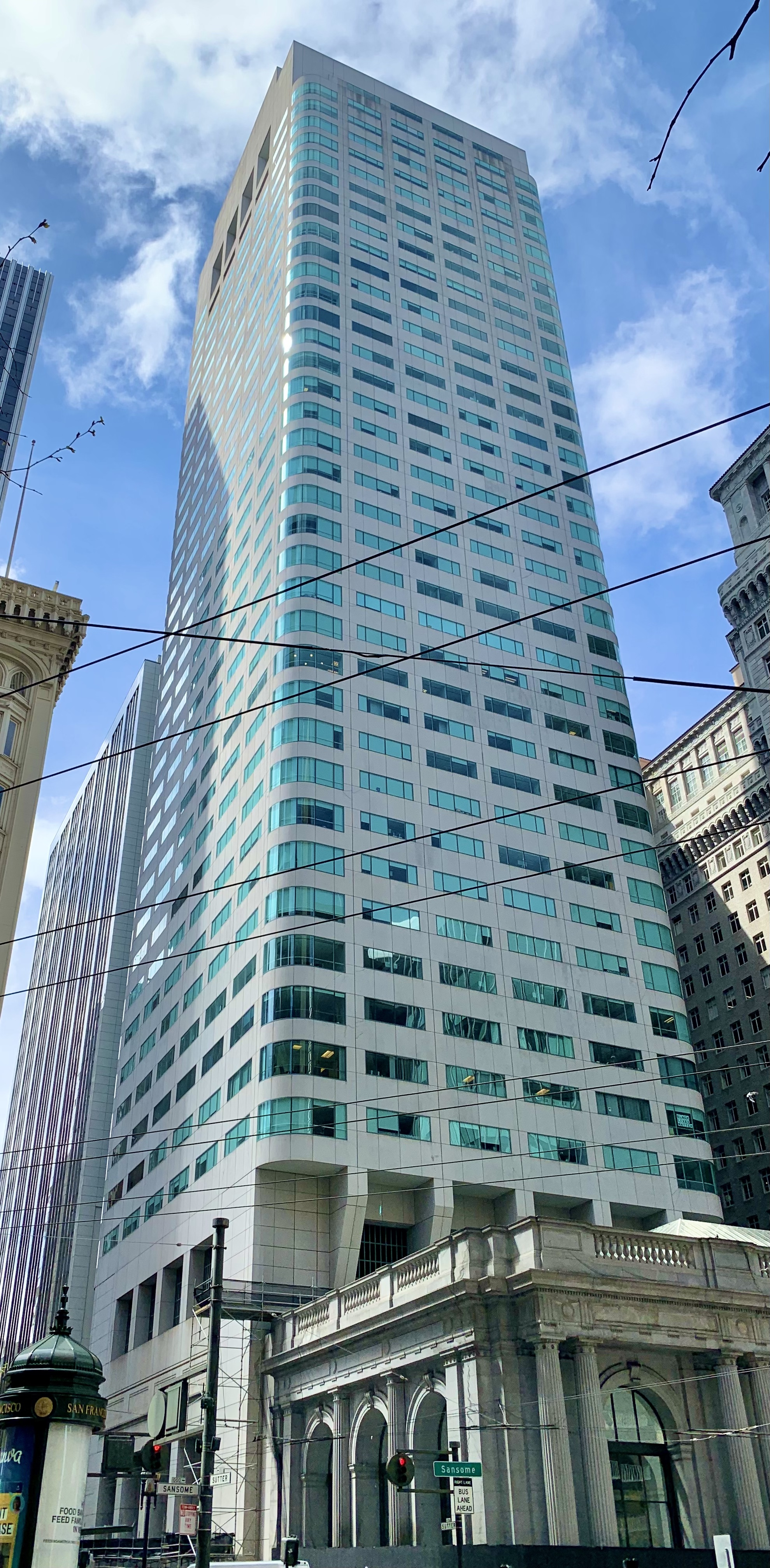
- In 2021

- Location within San Francisco Location within California Location within the United States
- Alternative names: Citigroup Center; Citicorp Center

General information
- Type: Commercial offices
- Location: 1 Sansome Street; San Francisco, California
- Coordinates: 37.790417°N 122.401278°W
- Completed: 1984
- Owner: Barker Pacific Group; Prudential Real Estate Investors

Height
- Roof: 168 m (551 ft)

Technical details
- Floor count: 41 or 42
- Floor area: 616,938 sq ft (57,315.4 m^{2})

Design and construction
- Architects: William L. Pereira & Associates

One Sansome Street, also known as Citigroup Center, is an office skyscraper located at the intersection of Sutter and Sansome Streets in the Financial District of San Francisco, California, United States, near Market Street. The 168 m (551 ft), 41 floor, 587,473 sq ft (54,578.0 m^{2}) office tower was completed in 1984.

== History ==
The One Sansome Street tower is built adjacent to the site of the ornate Anglo and London Paris National Bank, which was completed in 1910. Designed by architect Albert Pissis, the bank building was granite clad with 38 ft (12 m) high Doric columns. The historic architecture of the bank building serves as a conservatory for the skyscraper today.

One Sansome Street was acquired by Beacon Capital Partners LLC from BayernLB in 2005 for $217 million or $394.55 per ft² ($4,247.32 per m²). BayernLB bought the building in 1999 from subsidiaries of Citigroup and Dai-ichi Life for between $170–175 million, or $310–320 per ft² ($3,337–3,445 per m²). By 2010, it was owned by Broadway Partners Fund Manager, LLC. In 2010, a partnership between Barker Pacific Group and Prudential Real Estate Investors took ownership of the building. In 2011, Citigroup signed a lease extension through 2022 to remain the building's anchor tenant.

The building contains direct underground access to the Montgomery Street station.

== Tenants ==
- Capsilon
- Citigroup
- Consulate-General of Luxembourg, Suite 830
- Consulate-General of the United Kingdom, Suite 850
- Databricks
- Factset
- Golden Gate Global
- Houlihan Lokey
- Lime
- Michael Page
- Morgan Stanley
- Paycom
- Premier Business Centers
- Travelzoo
- United States Department of Housing and Urban Development
- Wikimedia Foundation (as of 2025)
- Wish

== In media ==
- In the 1986 film Quicksilver, the building represents the Pacific Stock Exchange entrance when Jack Casey (Kevin Bacon) meets Hector Rodriguez (Paul Rodriguez) on Sansome Street, just before Jack's "lightning strike".

== See also ==
Media related to One Sansome Street at Wikimedia Commons

- List of tallest buildings in San Francisco
