= Wikiquote =

Free repository of quotes hosted by the Wikimedia Foundation

- Wikiquote logo

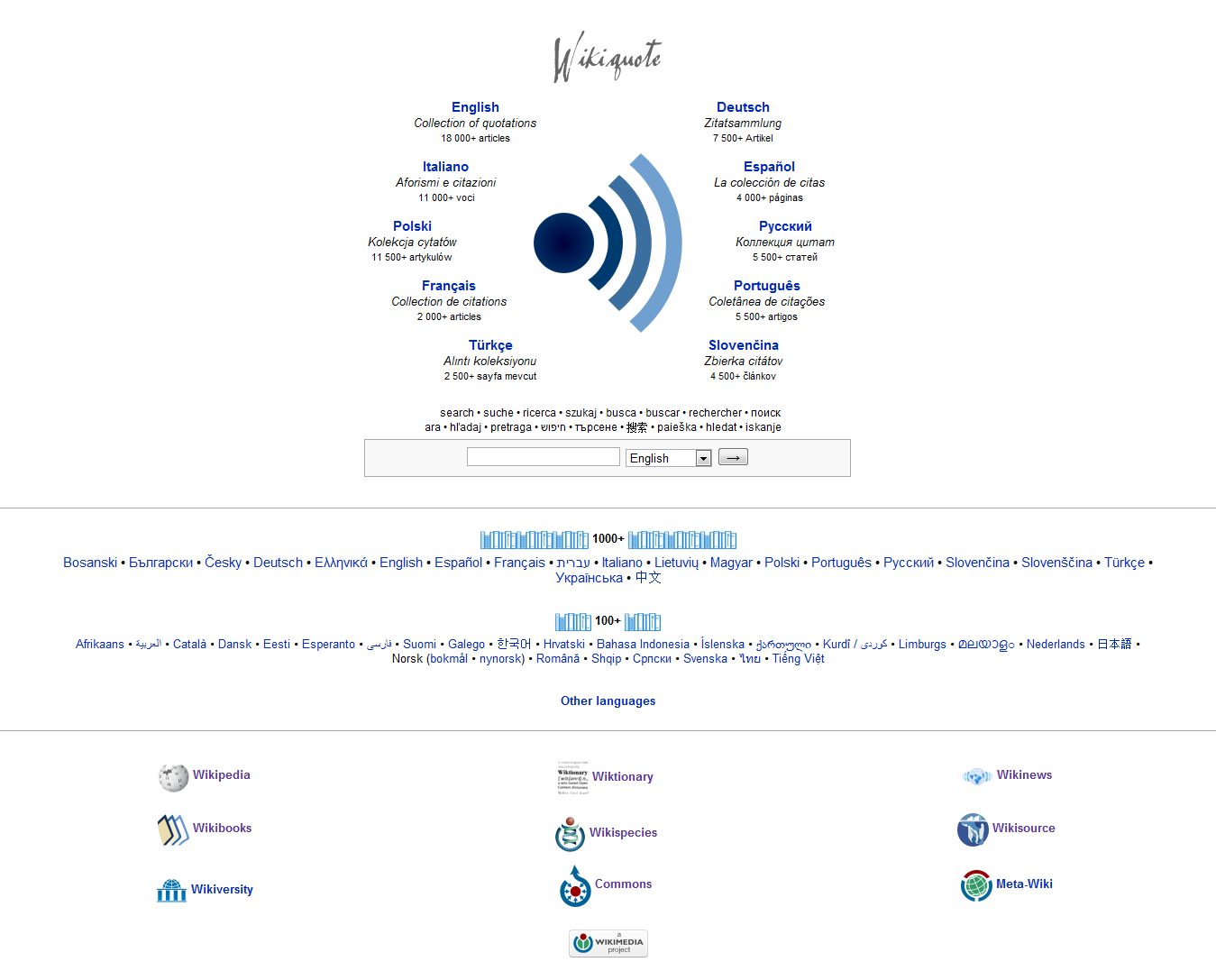
- Screenshot Screenshot of the wikiquote.org home page
- Website type: Quotation repository
- Available in: Multilingual (77 active)
- Owner: Wikimedia Foundation
- Creators: Daniel Alston, Brooke Vibber and the Wikimedia community
- Website: wikiquote.org
- Commercial: No
- Registration: Optional
- Launched: 10 July 2003; 23 years ago
- Current status: Active

Presentation about Wikiquote during the Wiki Indaba 2023 conference in Agadir, Morocco

Wikiquote is part of a family of wiki-based projects run by the Wikimedia Foundation using MediaWiki software. The project's objective is to collaboratively produce a vast reference of quotations from prominent people, books, films, proverbs, etc. and writings about them. The website aims to be as accurate as possible regarding the provenance and sourcing of the quotations.

Initially, the project operated only in English from July 2003, expanding to include other languages in July 2004. As of November 2026, there are active Wikiquote sites for 77 languages comprising a total of 390,218 articles and 2,641 recently active editors.

== History ==
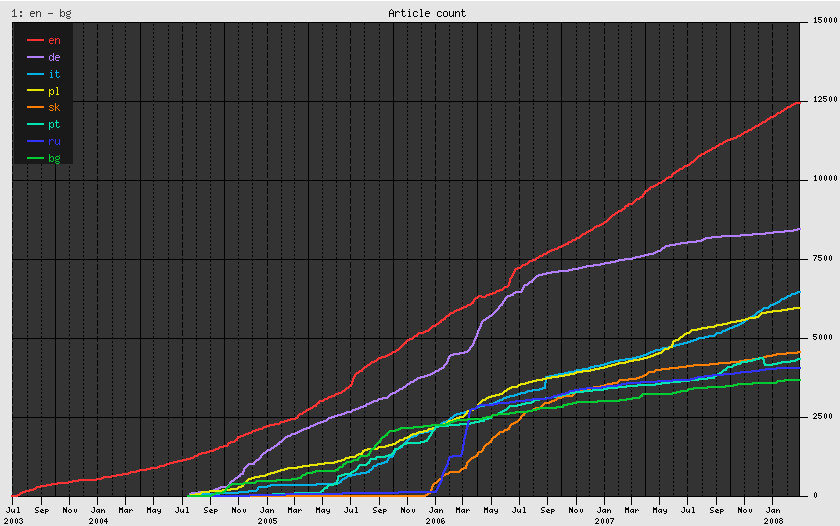
Growth of the largest eight Wikiquotes until early 2008

The Wikiquote site originated in 2003. The article creation milestones are taken from WikiStats.

Date	Event
27 June 2003	Temporarily put on the Wolof language Wikipedia (wo.wikipedia.org).
10 July 2003	Own subdomain created (quote.wikipedia.org).
25 August 2003	Own domain created (wikiquote.org).
17 July 2004	New languages added.
13 November 2004	English edition reaches 2,000 pages.
November 2004	Reaches 24 languages.
March 2005	Reaches 10,000 pages in total. English edition has close to 3,000 pages.
June 2005	Reaches 34 languages, including one classical (Latin) and one artificial (Esperanto)
4 November 2005	English Wikiquote reaches 5,000 pages.
April 2006	French Wikiquote taken down for legal reasons.
4 December 2006	French Wikiquote restarted.
7 May 2007	English Wikiquote reaches 10,000 pages.
July 2007	Reaches 40 languages.
February 2010	Reaches a total of 100,000 articles across all languages.
May 2016	Reaches a total of 200,000 articles among all languages.
January 2018	Introduced in the curriculum of national partnerships between schools and non-profits (Italy)

== Operation ==
Wikiquote is one of few online quotation collections that provide the opportunity for visitors to contribute and the very few which strive to provide exact sources for each quotation as well as corrections of misattributed quotations. Wikiquote pages are cross-linked to articles about the notable personalities on Wikipedia.

== Multi-lingual cooperation ==
As of November 2026, there are Wikiquote sites for 100 languages of which 77 are active and 23 are closed. The active sites have 390,218 articles and the closed sites have 638 articles. There are 4,540,709 registered users of which 2,641 were recently active.

The top ten Wikiquote language projects by mainspace article count:

No.	Language	ISO	Good	Total	Edits	Admins	Users	Active users	Files
1	English	en	73,105	247,664	4,028,453	17	3,365,730	1,228	0
2	Italian	it	56,287	211,665	1,430,310	7	108,667	158	262
3	Polish	pl	31,910	57,192	650,525	9	62,258	109	1
4	Russian	ru	18,115	45,978	450,732	5	114,447	119	0
5	Czech	cs	17,221	22,055	173,246	2	20,920	25	1
6	Estonian	et	13,715	23,587	136,235	2	5,726	13	2
7	Ukrainian	uk	12,560	42,575	162,664	5	21,373	30	0
8	Portuguese	pt	12,096	36,686	227,114	5	44,452	34	1
9	Hebrew	he	11,735	22,184	241,616	3	27,718	50	512
10	French	fr	11,139	39,752	469,134	6	83,931	131	0

For a complete list with totals see Wikimedia Statistics:

== Use in experiments ==
It can be possible to utilise Wikiquote as a text corpus for language experiments. The University of Wroclaw team entering Conversational Intelligence Challenge of the 2017 Conference on Neural Information Processing Systems (NIPS 2017) used Wikiquote to produce a conversational talker module for extraction of rare words. Researchers have used Wikiquote to train language models to detect extremist quotes.

== Reception ==
Wikiquote has been suggested as "a great starting point for a quotation search" with only quotes with sourced citations being available. It is also noted as a source for frequent misquotes and their possible origins. It can be used for analysis to produce claims such as "Albert Einstein is probably the most quoted figure of our time".

== See also ==
- Exact statistics
- Wiktionary
