= Poacher (disambiguation) =

A poacher is someone who engages in poaching.

Poacher may also refer to:

== Arts and entertainment ==
- Poacher (band)
- The Poacher (1926 film), a German silent drama film
- The Poacher (1953 film), an Austrian-German drama film
- Poacher (film), a 2018 British-Kenyan film
- Poacher (TV series), a fictional investigative crime series

== Other ==
- Poacher (fish), a common name for some fish species in the family Agonidae
- Poacher 21, an American sailboat design
- Poacher Line, a railway line in Lincolnshire, United Kingdom
- USS Sea Poacher
- Goal poacher, in association football
- Lincolnshire Poacher cheese, a cheese from the United Kingdom
  - The Lincolnshire Poacher
- a pan for poaching eggs
- The Poachers, an 1835 painting by James Arthur O'Connor
- Poacher International Jamboree, scout and guide jamboree taking place every four years in Lincolnshire

== See also ==
- Poaching (disambiguation), including Poach
