= Doron Weber =

American author (born 1955)

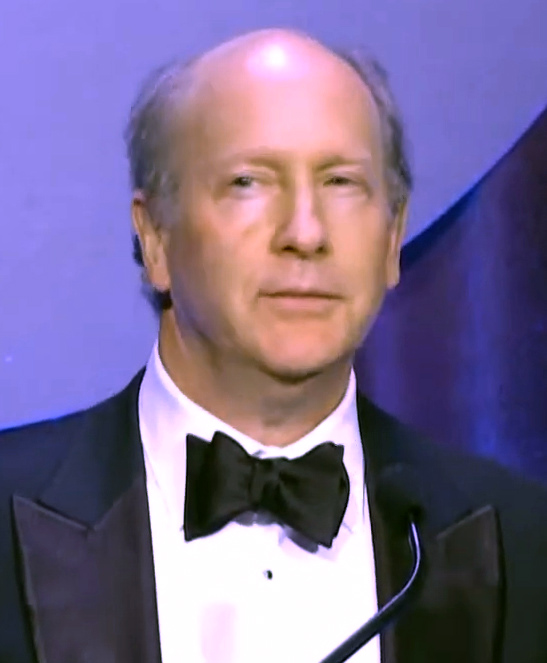
Weber in 2018

Doron Weber (born 1955) is an American author best known for his memoir, Immortal Bird: A Family Memoir, and a foundation executive. At the Alfred P. Sloan Foundation he has created programs in science and the arts.

== Early life ==
Born on a kibbutz in Israel in 1955, Weber studied at the Sorbonne and Oxford University (M.A., 1981), where he was a Rhodes Scholar.

== Immortal Bird ==
Weber's memoir, Immortal Bird, a portrait of a teenager's short, vibrant life and the relationship between father and son, documented the family's navigation of the medical journey of Doron and Shealagh Weber's first child, Damon, who was born in 1988 with a congenital heart defect. The defect, a single ventricle, was repaired, allowing him to lead a full life until he developed new complications as a teen. When he was 16, Damon received a successful heart transplant but then died of a post-transplant infection that was misdiagnosed as organ rejection and left untreated.

The family brought suit in 2006 against New York-Presbyterian Hospital/Columbia University Medical Center where their son was a patient but, as of 2013, the suit remained unresolved. In addition to being named by The Washington Post in 2012 as one of “50 notable works of nonfiction”, Immortal Bird was listed as one of Amazon's Best Books of the Month in February 2012, a February 2012 Indie NEXT List, and was one of nine selections of the 2013 Chautauqua Literary and Scientific Circle.

== Alfred P. Sloan Foundation work ==
Since 1995, Weber has worked as a program director at the Alfred P. Sloan Foundation, a nonprofit philanthropic organization that supports research and education in science, technology, and economic performance. As Vice President, Programs, Weber runs the Public Understanding of Science and Technology Program where he pioneered the synergistic use of media and the arts to translate science for the public. He has launched national programs in theater, film and television that commission, develop, produce, and distribute new work bridging the two cultures of science and the humanities.

== Awards ==
Sloan and his involvement were profiled in The New York Times, The Boston Globe, Fortune, Filmmaker Magazine, and The American Way. Weber won the National Book Award's Literarian Award for outstanding service in 2018.

== Other civic work ==
Weber serves as President of The Writers' Room Board of Trustees, Vice Chair of the Digital Public Library of America Steering Committee, Advisory Board Member of the Science and Entertainment Exchange, and Board Visitor of the Wikimedia Foundation.

== Publications ==
- Immortal Bird
- Final Passages (with Judith C. Ahronheim)
- "Sabbath's Theater". Boston Review. October–November 1995.
- “The Best and the Guiltiest,” The New York Times, July 26, 1993
