= Mayree Carroll Clark =

American business executive

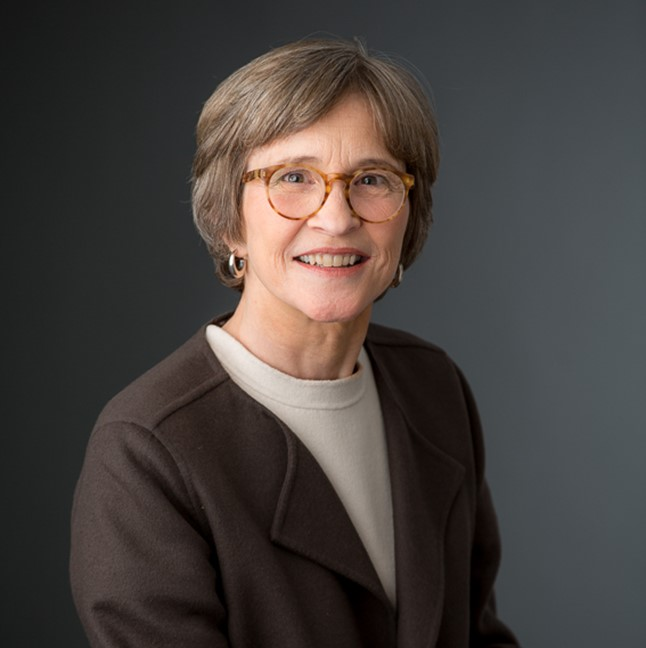
Mayree Clark

Mayree Carroll Clark (born March 9, 1957) is an American business executive and corporate director. She is known for her senior leadership roles at Morgan Stanley and for serving on the boards of major financial institutions, including Ally Financial and Deutsche Bank.

== Early life and education ==
Clark was born in Norman, Oklahoma. She earned a bachelor’s degree from the University of Southern California and an MBA from Stanford Graduate School of Business.

== Career ==
Clark spent 24 years at Morgan Stanley (c. 1981–2005), where she held senior roles including managing director, global research director, director of global private wealth management, and deputy to the firm’s chief executive officer and management committee. She also served as non-executive Chairman of Morgan Stanley Capital International (MSCI) before leaving the firm in 2005.

After departing Morgan Stanley, she worked as a partner and senior advisor at AEA Holdings and Aetos Capital. In 2011, she founded Eachwin Capital, an investment management firm.

== Board service ==
Clark joined the board of Ally Financial (then GMAC) in 2009, during the financial crisis, following the company’s stabilization by the U.S. Treasury.

She served as a director of the Stanford Management Company, which oversees Stanford University’s endowment, for eight years, including service on its executive committee.

In 2017, Clark joined the board of Taubman Centers, an international shopping mall operator. She chaired its Compensation Committee and served on the Nominating and Governance Committee and a Special Committee overseeing the company’s sale to Simon Property Group in 2020.

Clark joined the Supervisory Board of Deutsche Bank AG in 2018, during a period of corporate restructuring. She chairs the Risk Committee and has served on the Nomination and Strategy committees. From 2020 to 2022, she chaired the Nomination Committee, leading the external search for a new Supervisory Board chair.

== Nonprofit and public service ==
Clark is a life member of the Council on Foreign Relations. In 2024, she joined the board of the Wikimedia Endowment, and in 2025, she was appointed to the board of trustees of the Wikimedia Foundation.
