= Talkspace =

American virtual counseling and therapy service company

Talkspace, Inc.
- Type: Public
- Traded as: Nasdaq: TALK
- Industry: Psychotherapy
- Founded: 2012; 14 years ago
- Founders: Oren Frank; Roni Frank
- Headquarters: New York City, New York, U.S.
- Area served: United States
- Key people: Jon Cohen (CEO)
- Services: Online therapy Unlimited Messaging Therapy
- Website: www.talkspace.com

Talkspace, Inc. is an American company that provides online and mobile therapy services. Founded in 2012 by Oren and Roni Frank, Talkspace connects users with licensed therapists and psychiatrists through web and mobile platforms. The service offers communication through text, audio, and video messaging, as well as live video sessions in some cases. The company is headquartered in New York City.

== History ==
Talkspace was founded in 2012 by Roni and Oren Frank. The company was conceived after a transformative experience in couples therapy that saved their marriage. The results of psychotherapy were so meaningful for Roni Frank that, wanting to share it with others, she chose to pursue a master's degree in psychoanalysis and psychotherapy.

Talkspace began as a group therapy platform, but has evolved to a company offering online psychotherapy from licensed therapists.

In May 2015, Talkspace raised $9.5 million from Spark Capital and SoftBank. In June 2016, the company raised $15 million from Norwest Venture Partners.

In addition to reporting on a nationwide increase in demand for psychotherapy, Talkspace saw requests for therapy appointments triple in the wake of the 2016 presidential election, with increases seen across demographic groups, but were particularly high for minorities. According to a study conducted in partnership with HealthMap researchers at Boston Children's Hospital, a quarter of Talkspace users polled reported feeling "very stressed". In 2018, Talkspace hired Neil Leibowitz as its chief medical officer.

In September 2017, the company raised $31 million from a Series C round led by Qumra Capital. In August 2019, the company raised $50 million Series D funding and entered into a partnership with Optum.

Talkspace saw a significant increase in demand for psychotherapy during the COVID-19 pandemic, attributed to both the increased emotional toll of the pandemic and the restrictions put in place on people's physical movements. The company offered a free month of online therapy services to medical workers during the pandemic.

In June 2021, Talkspace became publicly traded after completing a merger with Hudson Executive Investment Corp., a special-purpose acquisition company. Its shares began trading on Nasdaq on June 23, 2021.

In November 2021, the chief operating officer, CEO, and head of clinical services all resigned within a span of weeks. The company disclosed that some of the resignations were in connection with an off-site company event. Shareholder rights law firms announced investigations that the company's former leadership violated securities law.

Jon Cohen became Talkspace CEO in September 2022.

In 2022, Talkspace shifted its primary focus from direct-to-consumer services to enterprise and payer partnerships, aiming to provide mental health services through health plans, employers, and government contracts.

In 2023, the company secured a $26 million contract with New York City to provide free therapy services to teens aged 13 to 17.

In 2024, Talkspace launched the Behavioral Health Consortium, a network that allows clinicians to refer insured members with high-acuity needs—such as substance use, alcoholism, and eating disorders—to in-network specialty care providers. In the same year, Talkspace and Ovia Health by Labcorp co-launched the Women's Health Coalition for Digital Solutions, a partnership aimed at advancing women's health through technology, service integration, and workplace policy advocacy. The coalition includes companies like Conceive, Evernow, FitOn, Nurx, Cove, and Nutrium, and seeks to improve healthcare access, reduce stigma, and develop employer-supported solutions tailored to women's diverse physical and mental health needs.

Also in 2024, Talkspace partnered with Amazon Health Services to offer virtual therapy services through Amazon's Health Benefits Connector, whereby users access insurance-covered care. The collaboration allows Amazon users to discover and verify their mental health benefits, then connect with a licensed Talkspace therapist through a simplified intake process.

By early 2025, Talkspace reported its first profitable quarter, attributing its success to business-to-business contracts and Medicare services growth.

In March 2026, American hospital operator Universal Health Services agreed to acquire Talkspace for $835 million.

== Product ==
Talkspace provides psychotherapy through an online subscription service accessible to users age 13 and older. Clients are matched with licensed therapists, who they communicate with online, or with optional video sessions. Therapists use common treatment methods including cognitive behavioral therapy.

Talkspace reports it has worked with more than a million clients, and partners with licensed providers across the United States. As of 2025, Talkspace services were available through Medicare (United States), and Medicare Advantage, and several major insurers. The platform is HIPAA-compliant, with licensed therapists who undergo background checks and training.

The company uses machine learning and artificial intelligence tools to analyze anonymized transcripts of therapy sessions to improve services, assist providers, and detect users at risk of self-harm.

In June 2026, Talkspace launched Tee, an AI chatbot to provide mental health support.

== Lawsuit ==
Following the resignation of its senior leadership team in 2021, Talkspace faced a securities class action filed by investors alleging that the company misled shareholders about its business before its SPAC merger. The suit claimed that the company failed to disclose its declining user base and overvalued its accounts. Talkspace later agreed to an $8.5 million settlement, which received final court approval in October 2023.

== Criticism ==
Psychologist Todd Essig has criticized Talkspace in four different articles for conflicting business and clinical interests, making scientific claims about its effectiveness, violating patient confidentiality, and other issues. In December, 2016, it was reported that Talkspace used faulty psychological practices, psychologists of uncertain qualifications, and a lack of regard for patient safety and confidentiality.

In 2018, the Psychotherapy Action Network (a therapist's advocacy organization) wrote a letter to the American Psychological Association and Michael Phelps calling attention to alleged concerns with the product. In response to the letter, the APA updated its policies to bar Talkspace from exhibiting at its conferences. Talkspace later filed a $40 million defamation lawsuit against the Psychotherapy Action Network. The lawsuit was dismissed in 2020.

In August 2020, The New York Times published results of an investigation of Talkspace employees, finding that they read transcripts from therapy sessions and that they were instructed by the company to post fake app store reviews using burner phones. The piece described the experiences of Ricardo Lori, an employee who shared his therapy chat logs for a Talkspace presentation at the request of an executive, only to later find that his identity had been revealed.

== See also ==
- BetterHelp
- Thriveworks
- Telepsychiatry
