= Employee poaching =

Employee recruiting practice

Employee poaching is an informal term for the practice of offering employment to a worker who is currently employed under another employer in a similar field.

The practice of hiring an employee in this way is a protected legal right in the United States, but can prompt accusations from the original employer for unrelated breaches of trust, such as violating non-compete agreements, or stealing trade secrets. Employee poaching for the purposes of stealing trade secrets is illegal.

Ethical and legal dilemmas over employee poaching arise from the conflict of interests between an employee's right to free access to the labour market, and an employer's right to protect knowledge and skills which it regards as company property.

Employers may attempt to prevent "employee poaching" by inserting non-compete clauses into employment contracts. However, beginning in 2024 within the United States, the FTC has enacted a broad federal ban on non-compete clauses, rendering them unenforceable outside of narrow circumstances.

== See also ==
- Antipoaching
- Trade secrets
- Unfair competition
- Union raid
