= Teladoc Health =

American healthcare company

Teladoc Health, Inc.
- Formerly: Teladoc Medical Services; Teladoc, Inc.
- Type: Public
- Traded as: NYSE: TDOC; Russell 2000 component
- Industry: Medical care
- Founded: 2002; 24 years ago in Dallas, Texas, US
- Founders: Byron Brooks; Michael Gorton
- Headquarters: New York City, US
- Areas served: 175+ countries
- Key people: Kenneth H. Paulus (Chairman); Chuck Divita, III (CEO); Mala Murthy (CFO)
- Brands: Teladoc; Advance Medical; Catapult Health; Uplift; Best Doctors; Livongo; BetterHelp; BetterSleep; InTouch Health; Telecare; HealthiestYou; MédecinDirect
- Services: Telemedicine, analytics
- Revenue: ▼US$2.57 billion (2024)
- Operating income: ▼US$−1 billion (2024)
- Net income: ▼US$−1 billion (2024)
- Total assets: ▼US$3.52 billion (2024)
- Total equity: ▼US$1.49 billion (2024)
- Number of employees: ~5,000 (2025)
- Subsidiaries: BetterHelp
- Website: teladochealth.com

Teladoc Health, Inc. is an American telemedicine and virtual healthcare company founded in 2002. Headquartered in New York City, its services include telehealth, employer-sponsored health plans, 24/7 care, mental health, diabetes and hypertension management, primary care, prescriptions, medical opinions, AI and analytics, telehealth devices and licensable platform services.

The company uses telephone and videoconferencing software and mobile apps to provide on-demand remote medical care. Teladoc Health is active in over 175 countries, and is traded on the New York Stock Exchange. It is the first and largest telemedicine company in the United States, and has acquired numerous other companies including BetterHelp in 2015, Best Doctors in 2017, and Catapult Health in 2025.

== History ==
=== 2002–2015 ===
Teladoc was founded in 2002 in Dallas, Texas, by G. Byron Brooks and Michael Gorton. It is the oldest and largest telemedicine company in the United States. Teladoc's initial business model allowed patients to remotely consult with state-licensed doctors at any time. Companies paid a monthly fee for their employees to access the service, while patients paid a flat fee for each consultation, originally about $35 to $40. With Gorton as both chairman and CEO, Teladoc launched nationally in 2005 at the Consumer Directed Health Care Conference in Chicago, Illinois. Teladoc had around 1 million members by the end of 2007, with large employers such as AT&T providing the service to employees as a health benefit. Jason Gorevic was named Teladoc's chief executive in 2009. In 2011, Aetna began offering Teladoc for its fully insured members in Florida and Texas, later offering Teladoc in all 50 states.

Teladoc acquired Consult A Doctor for $16.6 million cash in 2013, allowing smaller companies to access Teladoc's services. The Affordable Care Act led to a large number of insurance companies signing with Teladoc, resulting in a growth surge around 2014. By that time, insurance companies such as Blue Shield of California and Oscar had signed with Teladoc, as well as other companies such as Home Depot, T-Mobile, CalPERS, and Rent-A-Center. Teladoc acquired AmeriDoc for $17.2 million in May 2014. The acquisitions of Consult A Doctor and AmeriDoc, both Teladoc's main competitors, resulted in Teladoc becoming the largest telemedicine provider in the United States. After initial fundraising rounds in 2009, 2011, and 2013, Teladoc raised $50 million in 2014, bringing total funding to $100 million. Teladoc's sales doubled in both 2013 and 2014.

=== 2015–2016 ===
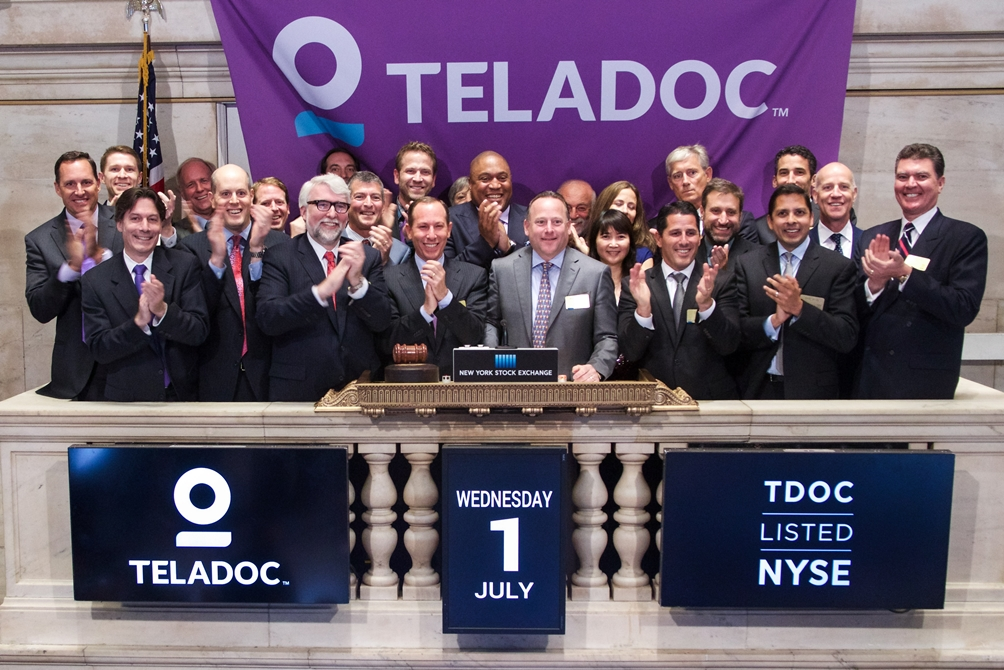
Teladoc executives ring the NYSE bell

Teladoc Health became a public company on July 1, 2015 as the only telemedicine company on the New York Stock Exchange. Teladoc's initial public offering listed at $19 per share, giving the company a market capitalization of $758 million and an enterprise value of $620 million. The initial response to the IPO was positive, as shares surged 50% on the opening day. Three months after the IPO, health insurer Highmark, which represented 1.5% of Teladoc's 2015 revenue, ceased to renew a contract. Teladoc shares fell significantly as a result, before rising to earlier levels. That October, it was the first telehealth company to reach one million visits.

In 2015, Teladoc acquired the behavioral health services provider Compile Inc., operating as BetterHelp for $3.5 million, and competitor Stat Health Services (StatDoc) for $30 million. The following year Teladoc began aggressively expanding, acquiring other companies and launching health segments for dermatology, behavioral health, and sexual health. That year the company won a patent infringement lawsuit filed against competitor American Well.

In July 2016, Teladoc acquired HealthiestYou for $125 million ($45 million in cash and $80 million in stock). Teladoc had 15 million members by November 2016 and a market share of 75% in the United States. The largest national network of virtual care providers in the nation, its full-service suite was operational in 48 states, excluding Arkansas and Texas. In December 2016, the American Hospital Association exclusively endorsed Teladoc's telehealth technology platform. Teladoc logged 952,000 patient visits that year.

=== 2017–2020 ===
In its largest acquisition at the time, in 2017 Teladoc spent $440 million purchasing Best Doctors, a consultation firm and provider of medical second opinions and medical award listings. In 2019, ProPublica criticized companies such as Best Doctors for selling physician awards as pay-to-play. Teladoc had 7,500 clients in 2017, of which 220 were Fortune 1000 companies. Sales that year were $233 million, 89% higher than the year prior. Teladoc Health brands by 2018 included Teladoc, Advance Medical, Best Doctors, BetterHelp and HealthiestYou.

On August 10, 2018, Teladoc, Inc. changed its name to Teladoc Health, Inc. while continuing to trade on the NYSE. Teladoc Health began partnering with CVS in August 2018 on remote consults at MinuteClinics. Teladoc Health acquired Advance Medical, a telemedicine company employing doctors in Latin America, Europe, and Asia, for $352 million in 2018. In December 2018, Teladoc Health's chief financial officer and chief operating officer Mark Hirschhorn resigned after a report that he engaged in a sexual relationship and insider trading with an employee. According to Yahoo Finance, stock value fell roughly 20% in the days following, while an investor class action lawsuit alleged that Teladoc Health had violated securities laws by failing to disclose Hirschhorn's behavior. Teladoc Health denied making false statements or any legal violations.

Active in 130 countries by 2019; that year, Teladoc acquired the French health company MédecinDirect and launched in Canada with the Teladoc Telemedicine Service. Joining from American Express, Mala Murthy was appointed CFO in June 2019.

In March 2020, Teladoc was providing "near real-time" surveillance data on the spread of coronavirus to the CDC. In July 2020, Teladoc acquired InTouch Health. In October 2020, Teladoc acquired the chronic care company Livongo Health for $13.9 billion in a deal described by the press as the third-largest for a U.S. company that year. The combined companies had an estimated enterprise value of $37 billion. Teladoc then brought in Florida Blue as the first insurer to use Livongo's digital diabetes program. Teladoc sued Amwell in October 2020 for alleged copyright infringement on nine patents, settling the case in July 2022.

=== 2021–2024 ===
In early 2021, paid membership in the U.S. was 52 million. In January 2021, Teladoc began offering a diabetes management service through Dexcom. Later that year, Teladoc Health launched myStrength Complete, a "unified mental health care platform for its B2B customers." In June 2021, Teladoc sued the company Avail for allegedly infringing on three patents related to telemedicine consoles.

On July 14, 2021, Teladoc announced it was collaborating with Microsoft to combine its delivery platform for hospitals and health systems with Microsoft Teams. Teladoc introduced its primary care service Primary360 on a national scale in October 2021. The program gave members access to both a primary physician and care team, with a system in place for followup reminders about appointments and personal maintenance. In February 2022, Teladoc Health launched Chronic Care Complete, a program to help patients manage multiple chronic conditions.

Teladoc had a valuation of roughly $11.3 billion by February 2022, and warned investors there might be a goodwill write-down that year related to the Livongo acquisition. Teladoc announced that Amazon could newly access Teladoc through Alexa and related devices, in February 2022, sparking debate among antitrust experts about the potential impact on the health industry. Amazon Care was shut down later that year.

In April 2022, Northwell Health began using the Teladoc platform with its clinicians, starting with 20 hospitals in the system. After Teladoc's stock value fluctuated significantly during the coronavirus pandemic, the company, in June 2022, was sued by investors alleging it had misrepresented its financial prospects, particularly in regard to its BetterHelp mental health subsidiary and chronic care business. Characterizing the lawsuit, which was later dismissed, as "frivolous," in July 2022, Teladoc reported revenue growth above analysts' projections, with significant growth in BetterHelp. In August 2022, Teladoc became the telehealth portal for Mayo Clinic Health System patients in Onalaska, Wisconsin.

In 2023, the company relocated its headquarters to new York City. Charles "Chuck" Divita, III, was appointed CEO in June 2024, leading the company's further expansion. In July, the firm launched Wellbound employee assistance program (EAP), incorporating BetterHelp into its U.S. employer-sponsored health plans.

=== 2025–present ===
In January 2025, the company added its virtual cardiometabolic programs to Amazon Health Services health benefits connector. That year, Teladoc Health made a series of acquisitions, including Catapult Health in February, mental healthcare company UpLift in April, and Australia's Telecare virtual care firm in August.

In March 2025, the FTC fined BetterHelp $7.8 million for sharing consumer data with third-party social media sites, banning the company from health data disclosures for advertising purposes. Subsequent to the dismissed June 2022 lawsuit, a new class-action was filed by investors in the U.S. District Court for the Southern District of New York on May 17, 2025.

The company reported over 100 million U.S. members in July 2025, and launched new AI capabilities for healthcare workplaces to monitor and mitigate violence that October. In November, Teladoc Health joined with Lumeris, Deloitte, Nuna and Unite Us as Collaborative for Healthy Rural America, pledging to build a shared, integrated care platform, following individual states' plan approvals from the new Rural Health Transformation (RHT) Program of the U.S. Department of Health and Human Services.

== Services and business model ==
Headquartered in New York City, the company operates two main components: Teladoc Health Integrated Care, its virtual care business for health plans, employers and health networks, and BetterHelp direct-to-consumer virtual mental health care. As a technology company, Teladoc Health is involved with artificial intelligence, analytics, telehealth devices, and "licensable platform services." The company uses telephone and videoconferencing software to provide on-demand remote medical care, with patients able to log on to the service at any time and be connected with a board-certified, state-licensed physician. Its app combines all of its services and programs.

Contracting largely with insurers and large employers, hospitals and health systems, Teladoc Health generates revenue through an annual, or monthly, fee charged per subscriber, as well as a fee for individual consults. Some companies waive or subsidize the consult fee for their employees.

By July 2020, the company stated it served "60 of the top 100 hospitals," with telemedical robots being used at hospitals such as Providence Regional Medical Center in Everett, Washington and Sheba Medical Center in Israel, minimizing the potential spread of coronavirus. Numerous studies analyzing Teladoc's impact on the industry have been conducted.

== Disaster aid ==
Teladoc Health provides free telehealth visits to communities affected by federally declared natural disasters and public emergencies in the United States, including to victims of incidents such as the 2018 Camp Fire in Paradise, California, Hurricane Ida in 2021, and the 2025 Southern California wildfires. In March 2023, it began providing free care to residents in Mississippi affected by recent tornadoes and, in 2024, to communities in several states that were impacted by Hurricanes Milton and Helene.

== Lobbying and legislation ==
Teladoc Health has been involved in lobbying for legislation in several states. In 2015 the Texas Medical Board ruled that state physicians had to physically meet patients before remotely treating ailments or prescribing medication. The bill undermined Teladoc Health's business model in Texas, where it had around two million subscribers. Teladoc Health sued in federal court over the rule in Teladoc v. Texas Medical Board, arguing the bill violated antitrust laws by inflating prices and limiting the supply of health care providers in the state. The bill, meant to go active on June 3, 2015, was stalled while the lawsuit went through a federal appeals court, allowing Teladoc Health to continue operating in Texas in the interim. Teladoc voluntarily dropped the lawsuit in 2017 after Texas passed a new bill allowing for remote treatment without a prior in-person interaction, which Teladoc Health had lobbied heavily for.

In January 2019, Teladoc Health opposed a telemedicine bill proposed by the North Dakota Board of Medicine, which required telemedicine providers to perform initial video examinations or have initial exams done by another physician. Proponents argued the bill protected patients, while Teladoc Health and critics argued it decreased access to healthcare in rural areas. The year prior, Teladoc Health had completed 1,500 virtual visits in the state. In May 2019, the company created a virtual care patient safety organization (PSO) dubbed the Institute for Patient Safety and Quality of Virtual Care.

In December 2021, Teladoc along with the American Medical Association, American Hospital Association, AARP, Amazon, Walmart, and CVS formed Telehealth Access for America, a coalition pushing for the extension of telehealth policies implemented by U.S. Congress in response to the COVID-19 pandemic. Subsequently, U.S. Senators Bill Cassidy and Tammy Baldwin introduced the Health Data Use and Privacy Commission Act in February 2022, which proposes creating a commission to study modernizing health data and privacy laws. The proposed legislation was supported by Teladoc and organizations such as the American College of Cardiology, IBM, and the United Spinal Association.

== See also ==
- Electronic consultation
- Health care in the United States
- Online doctor
