= BetterHelp =

Virtual mental health service

- Type: Subsidiary
- Industry: Psychotherapy
- Founded: 2013; 13 years ago
- Founders: Alon Matas; Danny Bragonier
- Headquarters: Mountain View, California, U.S.
- Area served: Worldwide
- Services: Online therapy Unlimited messaging therapy
- Parent: Teladoc Health (2015–present)
- Website: www.betterhelp.com

BetterHelp is a mental health platform that provides direct online counseling and therapy services via web or phone text communication. BetterHelp was founded in 2013 by Alon Matas and Danny Bragonier, and acquired by Teladoc in 2015, maintaining its service and brand name post-acquisition.

In 2023, BetterHelp agreed to pay $7.8 million to settle Federal Trade Commission charges that it shared customers' sensitive mental health data with Facebook, Snapchat, and other companies for advertising purposes despite promising to keep such information private.

== Background ==
BetterHelp was founded by Alon Matas in 2013. Matas partnered with co-founder Danny Bragonier to develop BetterHelp's web-based counseling portal and therapist directory. The company was originally incorporated in Delaware as Compile, Inc., but later began operating as BetterHelp.

In 2015, BetterHelp was acquired by Teladoc, a telehealth company of telemedicine service providers since 2002. Teladoc acquired BetterHelp for $3.5 million in cash and a $1 million promissory note, with an agreement to make annual payments to the sellers equal to 15% of the total net revenue generated by the BetterHelp business for each of the next three years.

=== Services ===
According to the company, BetterHelp's counseling staff consists of accredited psychologists; social workers; marriage and family therapists; and board-licensed counselors, each having a master's degree or doctorate with at least three years and 1,000 hours of experience. BetterHelp evaluates providers in a process that includes verifying licensure and requiring a case study exam, which is reviewed by a licensed clinician. BetterHelp offers individual therapy only, but its subsidiaries, Regain and Teen Counseling, provide couples counseling and teen therapy, respectively.

After subscribing, BetterHelp assigns users a "room" in which to send private messages, live chat, and schedule video or phone sessions with a counselor. The "room" is open 24/7 and can be accessed from any Internet-connected device. BetterHelp offers four live therapy sessions monthly.

== History ==
As of 2018, BetterHelp reported 33 million therapy sessions with more than 2,000 counselors on its site. In the same year, the company's revenue had reached a projected $60 million.

In 2021, BetterHelp partnered with Ariana Grande, offering $1 million worth of free therapy. According to Behavioral Health Business, the company worked with 2.5 million patients and brought in $700 million in revenue that year.

From 2020 through 2023, BetterHelp was the top purchaser of podcast ads, spending nearly $8 million on podcast ads in December 2023. BetterHelp has sponsored many YouTubers, leading the website Polygon to label it "one of YouTube’s most prominent sponsors".

In November 2023, Alon Matas announced that he was leaving the company after 10 years.

During the Gaza war, BetterHelp offered six months of therapy "at no cost for those affected by the war in Israel". This was first made known via an announcement on the Israeli government's official Twitter account. A spokesperson for BetterHelp's parent company told Snopes that this was "an independent initiative" and that Israel's government was not involved.

In May 2024, BetterHelp partnered with Tom Brady, giving away a month of free services.

=== FTC settlement regarding customer data ===
In March 2023, the Federal Trade Commission announced a complaint and proposed order against BetterHelp, alleging that the company shared consumers’ email addresses, IP addresses, and answers to health questions with Facebook, Snapchat, Criteo, and Pinterest for advertising purposes despite promising to keep such information private. In its 2022 privacy policy update, BetterHelp stated: "We may share your information in connection with an asset sale, merger, bankruptcy, or other business transaction." BetterHelp responded to complaints by saying it was legally required to retain health data. A 2020 analysis by Jezebel previously found that Facebook linked the time and duration of a user's therapy sessions and user's approximate location to Facebook profiles. Another firm, Mixtral, received data like the user's gender, age, and sexual orientation, location, device, financial status, and religion, albeit in an anonymized form.

On March 2, 2023, the FTC issued a proposed order banning BetterHelp from sharing consumers' health data with third parties. In July 2023, the FTC finalized the order, requiring BetterHelp to pay $7.8 million for consumer refunds and prohibiting the company from sharing consumers' health data for advertising. The FTC complaint tied to the proposed order alleges that BetterHelp collected health status and histories, IP addresses, and email addresses from consumers while making repeated promises to keep this information private. BetterHelp agreed to settle the FTC's allegations, and as of May 2024, have begun issuing refunds to affected customers. The company maintains that this settlement is not an admission of wrongdoing.

== Reception ==
In October 2018, concerns were raised by YouTubers (such as PewDiePie and Boogie2988) about the alleged use of unfair pricing, poor experiences, paid reviews from actors, and terms of service that allegedly did not correspond with ads promoted by professional YouTubers. Co-founder and then-CEO Alon Matas issued a statement responding to the allegations.

In 2024, BetterHelp was cited by the Federal Trade Commission for inappropriate use and selling of client data, breaching privacy regulations. BetterHelp has since been under scrutiny for misleading privacy policies.

== See also ==
- Talkspace – American virtual counseling and therapy service company
- Telepsychiatry – Mental-health care by telecommunication
