= Jon Cohen (physician) =

American corporate executive and physician

Jon R. Cohen is an American physician, business executive, and former public official who is currently the CEO of Talkspace, one of the largest telehealth, mental health companies in the U.S. He was previously executive chairman and CEO of Bioreference Laboratories.

Cohen has been featured in over 150 broadcast and written press interviews for his leadership during the COVID-19 crisis. Cohen served for over nine years as a senior executive and named executive officer at Quest Diagnostics. Originally as chief medical officer, and then as most recently as senior vice president and group executive – diagnostic solutions. Before joining Quest, Cohen served as senior advisor to New York governor David A. Paterson.

In 2006, Cohen ran unsuccessfully for Lieutenant Governor of New York. For seven years he served as chief medical officer at North Shore-Long Island Jewish Health System .(Northwell Health) Cohen is a vascular surgeon who completed his residency in surgery at New York Presbyterian Hospital/Weill Cornell Medical Center and vascular surgery fellowship at the Brigham and Women's Hospital at Harvard Medical School in Boston. He has published over 100 peer-reviewed professional articles and authored two books.

== Career ==
After arriving at the Long Island Jewish Medical Center in 1985, Cohen eventually served as chief of vascular surgery, chairman of surgery and surgeon-in-chief. As chief of vascular surgery, he established the first comprehensive vascular institute in New York. His major research contributions were into the pathophysiology of aortic aneurysm development at the molecular level. As Chairman of Surgery and Surgeon-in-Chief, Cohen's department grew to 18 surgeons, with an institutional surgical volume increasing from 17,000 to 25,000 cases per year.

From 1998 to 2000, Cohen was executive vice president of the three-hospital academic medical center with operational responsibility for the day-to-day operations of the 800-bed academic medical center with an annual budget of $600 million.

In 2000, Cohen was appointed as chief medical officer and senior vice president for the newly merged entity, North Shore-Long Island Jewish Health System.

Cohen was an executive officer at Quest with P/L as the corporation's chief medical officer from 2009 to 2015. As director of hospital services, Cohen had operational responsibility for all of the reference testing performed at Quest's four national esoteric laboratories servicing over 3,000 customers worldwide, including hospitals, commercial labs, Department of Defense, Veterans Administration, State and County Departments of Health, Prisons and Indian Services.

Cohen was executive chairman and CEO of from 2019 to 2022. Bioreference Laboratories is one of the largest full-service commercial laboratories in the U.S. with revenues of almost $ 1Billion, serving all 50 States with labs in New Jersey, California, Texas and Florida.

Cohen led Bioreference to national prominence during the COVID-19 crisis. He was featured in over 150 broadcast and written press interviews over the 24 months during the crisis. He recently published a book about that experience, “SWAB, Leadership in the Race to Provide COVID Testing to America.”

== Political activities ==
In 2002, Cohen served as health care policy advisor to gubernatorial candidate H. Carl McCall a in 2004 to presidential candidate John Kerry.

In 2005, Cohen announced his candidacy for the Democratic nomination for Lieutenant Governor of New York. Cohen raised more than $700,000 for his election bid, the largest amount for a Lieutenant Governor race in New York state history. Cohen called the healthcare system "dysfunctional at every level." He proposed linking universal health-insurance coverage to economic development, repeating his message that "health care is a right, not a privilege." He favored setting up an insurance pool backed by private carriers that would spread the risk of health care coverage, making it affordable for small businesses, as well as spearheading state-led investment in biotechnology and stem cell research to foster job creation and medical innovation. Cohen further developed plans to cut fraud and waste from the Medicaid system, which he blamed for ruining county budgets, stating, "What's happening is, there's too little money left for roads, for senior citizen programs and for schools."

When the Democratic frontrunner for governor, Eliot Spitzer, named Paterson as his running mate, Cohen dropped his own candidacy. Cohen nominated Paterson for Lieutenant Governor during the 2006 New York Democratic Party convention, held in Buffalo, New York.

When Paterson succeeded Spitzer as Governor of New York, Paterson appointed Cohen as his senior advisor. As senior advisor, Cohen was responsible for developing all policy and strategic planning as related to healthcare, education, environment, economic development, energy, transportation, homeland security and local governments. Cohen was one of the six senior staff responsible to the Governor for the coordinated activities of 83 agencies, 600 authorities, 200,000 employees and a budget of $124 billion.
