= Antipoaching =

Anti-competitive employment practice

Antipoaching (or no-poach agreement) is an anti-competitive conduct where companies conspire not to hire each other's employees.

Antipoaching agreements, or no-poach agreements, are related to non-compete clauses, but distinct—no-poach agreements are among employers, non-compete clauses are between employer and company. In the United States, antipoaching agreements have been widespread among franchise businesses: Research has found that 58 percent of major franchisors' contracts in 2016, including those of McDonald's, Burger King, Jiffy Lube, and H&R Block, contained agreements not to hire the workers of other franchisees. Some franchisors have since stated that they would drop those agreements.

Antipoaching agreements may be illegal under U.S. antitrust law in some circumstances. Major high-tech companies in the United States, such as Adobe, Apple, Intuit, Intel, eBay, Google, Lucasfilm and Pixar, entered into at least one no-poach agreement. These firms reportedly engaged in the following behaviors: "Managers informed recruiters which potential hires were off-limits and some human resources departments maintained written lists. Some agreements included additional anticompetitive restraints, such as prohibition of bidding wars. Enforcement was straightforward. In cases where a firm violated an agreement, its counterparty often contacted a senior manager at the violating firm, who would then put a stop to the violation." These tech firms were the basis of the High-Tech Employee Antitrust Litigation. A 2025 study found that this collusion reduced wages at the colluding firms by 5.6%, reduced stock bonuses for employees, and led to worse job satisfaction.

== See also ==
- Employee poaching
- High-Tech Employee Antitrust Litigation
- Non-compete clause
- Market power
