= Poacher 21 =

1979 US recreational keelboat

Development
- Designer: W. Richardson
- Location: United States
- Year: 1980
- No. built: about 50
- Builder: Parker Dawson Yachts
- Role: Racer-Cruiser

Boat
- Displacement: 1,800 lb (816 kg)
- Draft: 4.50 ft (1.37 m) with lifting keel down

Hull
- Type: monohull
- Construction: fiberglass
- LOA: 21.08 ft (6.43 m)
- LWL: 18.00 ft (5.49 m)
- Beam: 7.50 ft (2.29 m)
- Engine: outboard motor

Hull appendages
- Keel: lifting keel
- Ballast: 550 lb (249 kg)
- Rudder: transom-mounted rudder

Rig
- Rig type: cat ketch

Sails
- Sailplan: cat rigged ketch
- Total sail area: 228 sq ft (21.2 m^{2})

Racing
- PHRF: 201

The Poacher 21, also called the Parker Dawson Poacher, is a recreational keelboat built by Parker Dawson Yachts in Hingham, Massachusetts, United States from 1979 until 1984, with about 50 boats completed.

== Design ==
The Poacher 21 is a recreational keelboat, built predominantly of fiberglass, with wood trim. It has an unstayed cat-rigged ketch rig, a raked stem, a plumb transom, a transom-hung rudder controlled by a tiller and a lifting keel. It displaces 1,800 lb (816 kg) and carries 550 lb (249 kg) of ballast.

The two masts are identical, with the aft one mounted slightly lower. The sails are equipped with luff sleeves, rather than halyards. Both sails have wishbone booms. The sails are identical and interchangeable.

The boat has a draft of 4.50 ft (1.37 m) with the lifting keel extended and 1.67 ft (0.51 m) with it retracted, allowing operation in shallow water or ground transportation on a trailer.

The boat is normally fitted with a small 3 to 6 hp (2 to 4 kW) outboard motor for docking and maneuvering.

The design has sleeping accommodation for four people, with a double "V"-berth in the bow cabin and two straight settee berths in the main cabin. The galley is located on the port side just forward of the companionway ladder and is equipped with a sink. Cabin headroom is 48 in (122 cm).

The design has a PHRF racing average handicap of 201 and a hull speed of 5.6 kn (10.4 km/h).

== Reception ==
In a 2010 review Steve Henkel wrote, "Parker Dawson Yachts ... produced this out-of-the-ordinary craft, of which 50 or so were built from 1979 into the early 1980s. The split rig is unusual in a boat this small, since the configuration often means less total sail area. But in this case, the Poacher's sail area is higher than any of her comp[etitor]s ... Best features: The Poacher's shallow draft with board up gives her a good capability to explore beaches. She also has foam flotation. Worst features: Unlike the fin keels or centerboards of her comp[etitor]s, the Poacher has a daggerboard, and a rather deep one (4' 6") at that. The rudder is also the vertical-lifting type. We don't like vertically lifting blades, on the theory that in rocky shallows the system could result in severe damage to the daggerboard trunk and/or rudder assembly. Also, in addition to limiting total sail area, split rigs can be harder to trim properly, and therefore may be harder to sail, especially when going downwind."
