= Ding Ying (disambiguation) =

Ding Ying or Ying Ding may refer to:

- Ding Ying (1888–1964), Chinese agronomist and university president
- Ying Ding (biostatistician), professor of biostatistics in the University of Pittsburgh
- Ying Ding (information scientist), professor of information at the University of Texas at Austin
