= Wikimedia movement =

Group of global contributors to Wikimedia projects

- Wikimania 2026 group photograph
- Type: Informal organization of individual contributors, chapters, user groups and thematic organizations
- Purpose: Free, open-content, wiki-based Internet projects
- Region served: Worldwide
- Services: Authoring and editing Wikipedia, Wikibooks, Wikidata, Wikimedia Commons, Wikinews (closed), Wikiquote, Wikisource, Wikispecies, Wikiversity, Wikivoyage, Wikifunctions and Wiktionary; Developing MediaWiki software
- Website: wikimedia.org

The Wikimedia movement is the global community of contributors to the Wikimedia projects, including Wikipedia. This community directly builds and administers these projects with the commitment of achieving this using open standards and software. It has been described by New Yorker staff writer Margaret Talbot as an important "bulwark" against misinformation and an assault on reliable sources, contributing to an informed citizenry.

First created around and by the Wikipedia's community of volunteer editors, known as Wikipedians, it has since expanded to other projects like Wikimedia Commons and Wikidata and volunteer software engineers and developers contributing to MediaWiki, the software used to power Wikimedia.

== Projects ==
=== Content projects ===
As of 2026, Wikimedia's content projects include:

- Wikipedia – an online encyclopedia
- Meta-Wiki – a Wikimedia wiki project idea discussion and coordination location
- Wikibooks – a repository for educational textbooks
- Wikidata – a shared repository of structured data, accessible by the other projects
- Wikifunctions – a catalog of functions and source code. It is designed to support Abstract Wikipedia, a language-independent version of Wikipedia using structured data.
- Wikimedia Commons – a shared repository of free-to-use media like images, videos and sounds, accessible by the other projects
- Wikinews (closed) – a repository for news articles
- Wikiquote – a collection of quotations
- Wikisource – a library of source texts and documents
- Wikispecies – a taxonomic catalogue of species
- Wikiversity – a repository of educational materials
- Wikivoyage – a travel guide
- Wiktionary – a dictionary

=== Infrastructure and interface projects ===
Other supporting projects in the Wikimedia movement include:

- Kiwix – a community project for offline access to the content projects
- MediaWiki – the open source platform for the projects
- Toolforge – a community space for hosting software projects that need access to the cluster
- Volunteer Response Team – a community handling email inquiries
- Wikimedia cloud services – a space for shared cloud computing, built on OpenStack
- Wikitech – a community of developers with a wiki and mailing list

== Organizations ==
=== Project communities ===
The Wikimedia community includes a number of communities devoted to single wikis, such as the following.

The Meta community is a multilingual cross-project community developed on the Meta-Wiki (meta.wikimedia.org) where translation and governance discussions happen.

The Wikipedia community, known as Wikipedians, is the community of contributors of the online encyclopedia Wikipedia. It consists of editors, some operating Wikipedia bots, and administrators. The Arbitration Committee (or ArbCom) is a court of last resort for disputes on Wikipedia.

Wikipedians in residence are Wikipedians and Wikimedians who collaborate with a cultural institution to help integrate its work into the projects.

=== Thematic organizations ===
Thematic organizations are charities, similar to chapters, founded to support Wikimedia projects in a subject focal area. As of 2021 there are two such organizations. WikiPortraits, started in 2024, is a group of photographers, funded by the WMF, working to improve Wikipedia's access to freely-licensed photos of notable people.

=== Wikimedia chapters ===
Wikimedia chapters (blue) Wikimedia user groups with a geographic focus (green)

National and regional community groups have incorporated chapters, charitable organizations that support Wikimedia projects and their participants in specified countries and geographical regions. As of 2021 there are 39 chapters. Over time the agreements between chapters and WMF became more formalized.

Wikimedia Deutschland (WMDE) is the oldest chapter, holding its first meeting in 2004. As of 2016, it had a budget of €20 million. Some chapters such as WMDE get some of their funds directly from grants and supporting memberships. Some others get their funds primarily from annual plan grants from WMF. As of 2019, roughly 10% of the WMF budget is distributed in this way to chapters and thematic organizations.

=== Wikimedia Foundation ===
The Wikimedia Foundation (WMF) is an American non-profit and charitable organization headquartered in San Francisco. It owns the domain names and maintains most of the movement's websites. According to WMF's 2015 financial statements, in 2015 WMF had a budget of US$72 million, spending US$52 million on its operation, and increasing its reserves to US$82 million. WMF is primarily funded by donations with the average donation being $15.

WMF was founded in 2003 by Jimmy Wales so that there would be an independent charitable entity responsible for the domains and trademarks, and so that Wikipedia and its sister projects could be funded through non-profit means in the future. Its purpose was "... to empower and engage people around the world to collect and develop educational content under a free license or in the public domain, and to disseminate it effectively and globally."

=== Wikimedia user groups ===
There are over 800 language editions of different Wikimedia projects, each with groups of editors working on areas of shared interest. Some have Wikiprojects with their own project pages, membership lists, and open task trackers. Some also register as community user groups to participate in movement governance, use community logos outside of the wikis, and receive grants for events and projects. As of 2023, there are over 140 user groups.
