= Sokonte Huttin Davies =

Nigerian politician

Member of House of Representative
- In office June 2007 – June 2015
- Constituency: Degema / Bonny Federal Constituency

Personal details
- Born: 1963 (age 62–63)
- Party: All Progressive Congress
- Occupation: Politician

Sokonte Huttin Davies is a Nigerian politician. He served as the representative for the Degema/Bonny Federal Constituency in the 6th and 7th House of Representatives.

== Background and early life ==
Sokonte is from Rivers State, Nigeria and was born in 1963.

== Education ==
In 1981, Davies studied at the Rivers State University of Science and Technology, Nkpolu, Port Harcourt, Rivers State, Nigeria. He furthered his education at the Belorussia Agricultural Academy, Belarus in 1984. He earned a master's degree in economics (MSc) from Crimea M.I. Kalinin Agricultural Institute, Ukraine in 1989. He obtained his Doctor of Philosophy (Ph.D.) in Economics/Management from South China Agricultural University, China, in June 2000.

== Career ==
Davies's career is marked by a combination of business, public service, and political achievements.

=== Professional career ===
Sokonte worked at Sungrace Investment, Guangzhou, China, in 2000 as a Strategic Planner and Business Analyst.He co-founded the Public Policy and Leadership Centre in Port Harcourt in 2001. In 2002, he was appointed the CEO of Seivad Global Resources, Port Harcourt. He also served as the Director of the Grassroots, Port Harcourt political development center, Rivers State, Nigeria.

=== Political career ===
In 2007, Davies served as a member of the 6th and 7th House of Representatives, representing the Degema/Bonny Federal Constituency where he served till 2015. During this period, he served on several committees, including Foreign Affairs, Information & National Orientation, Culture & Tourism, Environment, National Population, Army, and Diaspora. Notably, he was the Deputy Chairman of the House Committee on Land Transport (2011–2015).

He was elected under the platform of the People's Democratic Party (PDP) and served from 2007 until his defection to the All Progressives Congress (APC) in December 2013. Following his defection, he continued to represent his constituency under the APC until the end of his tenure in 2015.

Davies was a gubernatorial aspirant for the 2023 Rivers State governorship election under the All Progressives Congress (APC), with support from the former Governor Rotimi Amaechi.

=== Public service ===
President Muhammadu Buhari appointed Sokonte Davies as the executive director of Marine Operations at the Nigerian Ports Authority (NPA).
