= Justine Toms =

Bulgarian entrepreneur and author

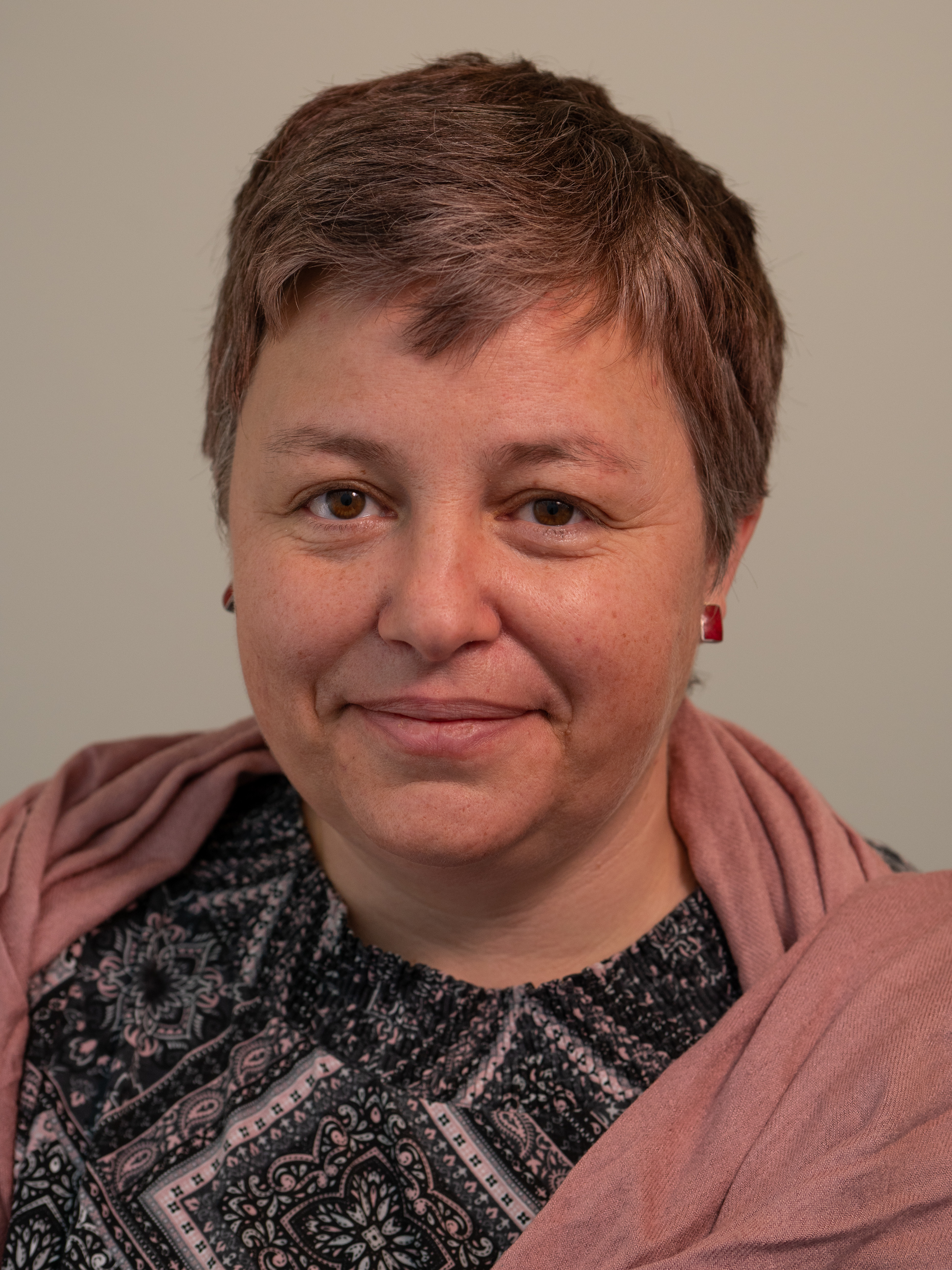
Justine Toms, 2019

Justine Toms (Bulgarian: Жюстин Томс; born 1971 in Sofia) is a Bulgarian entrepreneur, university lecturer and author.

== Biography ==
Toms was born in Sofia in 1971. She completed a master's degree in philosophy, pedagogy and French philology at the University of Sofia. She has been working in digital marketing since 1998 and runs her own agency. In addition, Toms has been a lecturer at the New Bulgarian University (NBU) and the “Software University” (СофтУни, SoftUni) since 2007.

Toms is well known in the Bulgarian internet community and has published about 20 books on internet, online marketing and business start-ups. Toms started the online book initiative "Книгата, която ме вдъхновява" (The book that inspires me) with Svetlozar Petrov from JobTiger in 2014 to encourage people to read more. Another initiative is «Училище за бъдеще.» (School of the future) for which four events with 100 teachers each took place in 2018 and 2019. Toms is a volunteer in the global Wikimedia movement.

== Selected publications ==
- «Основи на уеб дизайна. Принципи, технологии, възможности.» 2004.
- «Интернет рекламата. Мисията – възможнаИнтернет рекламата. Мисията – възможна.» 2005.
- with Горица Василева Белогушева: «Онлайн маркетинг. Мисия още по-възможна.» 2007.
- with Камелия Георгиева: «Инструменти за социални мрежи. маркетинг в епохата на Web 2.0.» 2011.
- with Павлина Димитрова Козарова: «Основи на успешния бизнес тук и сега. съвети за млади предприемачи и мениджъри.» 2012.
- with Симеон Младенов Колев: «Мисия “татко”.» 2015.
- with Богдана Трифонова: «Мисия мама.» 2016.
