= Denny Vrandečić =

Croatian computer scientist (born 1978)

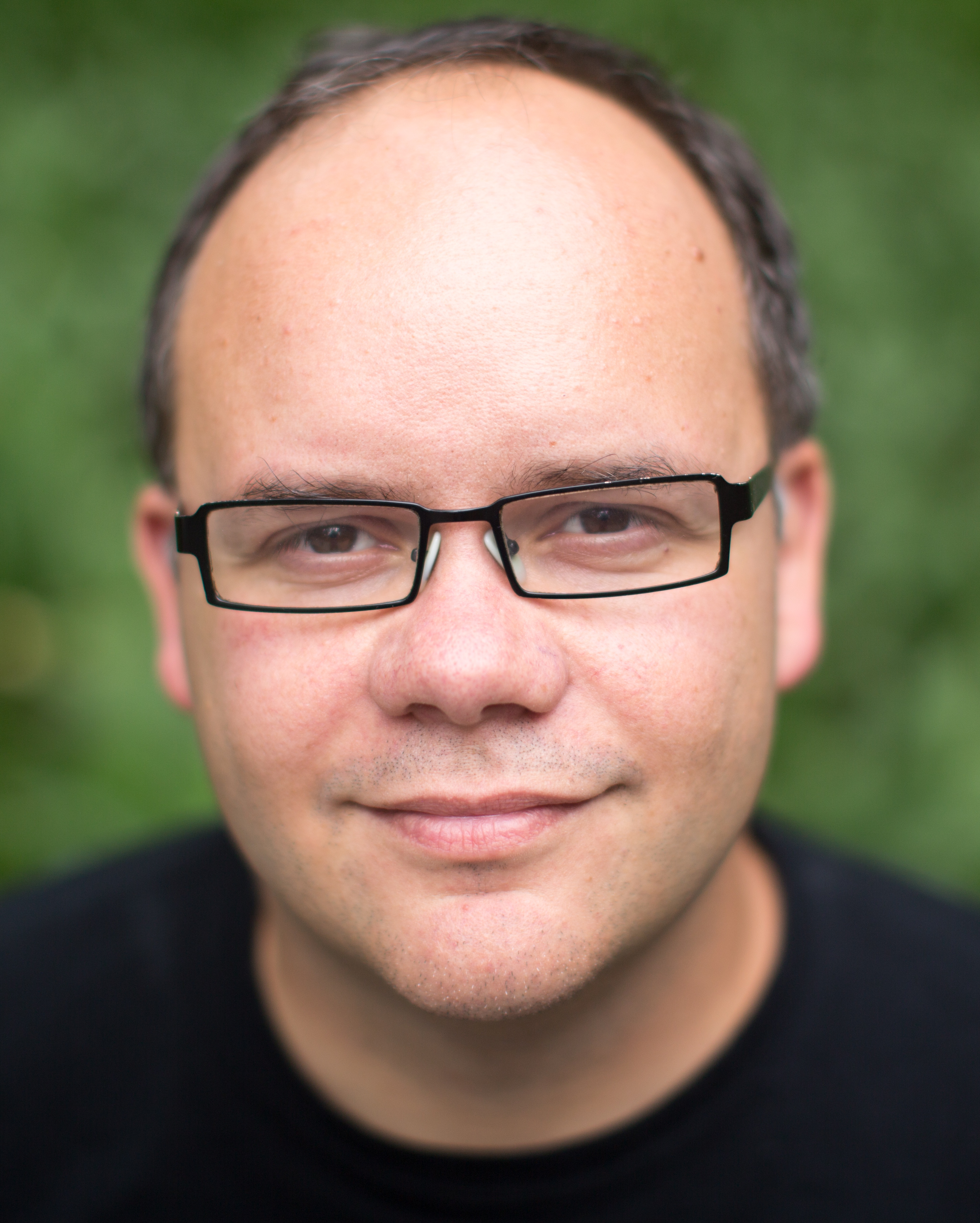
- Denny Vrandečić in 2015
- Born: Zdenko Vrandečić; 27 February 1978 (age 48); Stuttgart, Germany
- Education: Karlsruhe Institute of Technology (PhD)
- Known for: Wikidata; Wikifunctions; Semantic MediaWiki
- Scientific career
- Fields: Wikis; Semantic Web; Semantic wikis Web-based collaborative systems
- Workplaces: Google; Wikimedia Foundation; University of Southern California
- Thesis: [doi:10.5445/IR/1000018419 Ontology evaluation] (2010)
- Doctoral advisor: Rudi Studer
- Website: simia.net

Zdenko "Denny" Vrandečić (born 27 February 1978) is a Croatian computer scientist. He was a co-developer of Semantic MediaWiki and Wikidata, the lead developer of the Wikifunctions project, and an employee of the Wikimedia Foundation as a Head of Special Projects, Structured Content. He published modules for the German role-playing game The Dark Eye.

He lived in the San Francisco Bay Area in California, United States, until mid 2024, after which he returned to Stuttgart.

== Education ==
Vrandečić attended the Geschwister-Scholl Gymnasium in Stuttgart and from 1997 he studied computer science and philosophy at the University of Stuttgart. He received his doctorate in 2010 at the Karlsruhe Institute of Technology (KIT), where he was a research associate in the Knowledge Management Research Group at the Institute for Applied Computer Science and Formal Description Languages (AFIB), with Rudi Studer, from 2004 to 2012. In 2010, he visited the University of Southern California (ISI).

== Career and research ==
Vrandečić is involved in knowledge bases, data mining, massive web-based collaboration, and the Semantic Web. In 2012/2013, he was project manager for Wikidata (Wikipedia sister project) at Wikimedia Germany. Together with Markus Krötzsch (who was also at KIT in the Knowledge Management group), he is co-developer of the Semantic MediaWiki (SMW), which was also the inspiration for Wikidata.

In 2013 Vrandečić worked as an ontologist at Google on the Knowledge Graph, the knowledge base used by Google to compile its search engine results with semantic information from various sources. In September 2019, Vrandečić announced that he was taking on a new role in Google's development department as Wikimedian in Residence, which consisted of explaining Wikimedia projects to other employees.

In July 2020, he left Google to join the Wikimedia Foundation, where he has since been involved in building Wikifunctions and Abstract Wikipedia. It aims to use structured data from Wikidata to create a multilingual, machine-driven knowledge platform. In his essay contribution to Wikipedia's 20th anniversary publication, Wikipedia @ 20 - Stories of an Unfinished Revolution, he elaborates both technical and personal reasoning on urgencies for smaller and even for bigger language Wikipedia editions.

Vrandečić is one of the founders and administrators of Croatian Wikipedia. In 2008, he served as head of the scientific program of Wikimania. Vrandečić served on the Board of Trustees from 2015 to 2016.

=== Publications ===
Vrandečić's publications include:

- Denny Vrandečić; Markus Krötzsch (October 2014). "Wikidata: a free collaborative knowledgebase". Communications of the ACM. 57 (10): 78–85. doi:10.1145/2629489. ISSN 0001-0782. Wikidata Q18507561.
- Markus Krötzsch; Denny Vrandečić; Max Völkel; Heiko Haller; Rudi Studer (December 2007). "Semantic Wikipedia". Journal of Web Semantics. 5 (4): 251–261. doi:10.1016/j.websem.2007.09.001. ISSN 1570-8268. S2CID 45934347. Wikidata Q27826821.
- Anupriya Ankolekar; Markus Krötzsch; Thanh Tran; Denny Vrandečić (February 2008). "The two cultures: Mashing up Web 2.0 and the Semantic Web". Journal of Web Semantics. 6 (1): 70–75. doi:10.1016/j.websem.2007.11.005. ISSN 1570-8268. Wikidata Q27634247.
- Denny Vrandečić (July 2013). James Hendler; Elena Simperl (eds.). "The Rise of Wikidata". IEEE Intelligent Systems. 28 (4): 90–95. doi:10.1109/mis.2013.119. ISSN 1541-1672. Wikidata Q37108228.
- Denny Vrandečić (October 2018). "Capturing meaning: Toward an abstract Wikipedia" (PDF). Proceedings of the ISWC 2018 Posters & Demonstrations, Industry and Blue Sky Ideas Tracks. CEUR Workshop Proceedings. 2180. Wikidata Q56876997.
- Denny Vrandečić (8 April 2020), Architecture for a multilingual Wikipedia (PDF), arXiv:2004.04733, Wikidata Q95946302
- Denny Vrandečić (April 2021). "Building a Multilingual Wikipedia". Communications of the ACM. 64 (4): 38–41. doi:10.1145/3425778. ISSN 0001-0782. Wikidata Q106143058.

== Personal life ==
Vrandečić family and his parents are from Pučišća on the island of Brač.

Vrandečić holds both Croatian and US citizenship.

He lived with his wife and daughter in the Bay Area, until summer 2024 when they moved to Stuttgart.
