= Lu Yonggen =

Chinese agronomist, plant geneticist, educator, and philanthropist (1930–2019)

- 卢永根
- Born: 2 December 1930; British Hong Kong
- Died: 12 August 2019 (aged 88); Guangzhou, Guangdong, China
- Education: South China Agricultural University
- Spouse: Xu Xuebin
- Children: 1 daughter
- Scientific career
- Fields: Rice genetics
- Workplaces: South China Agricultural University
- Academic advisors: Ding Ying

Chinese name
- Simplified Chinese: 卢永根
- Traditional Chinese: 盧永根
Transcriptions
Standard Mandarin
- Hanyu Pinyin: Lú Yǒnggēn
- Wade–Giles: Lu Yung-ken
Yue: Cantonese
- Jyutping: lou4 wing5 gan1

Lu Yonggen (Chinese: 卢永根; 2 December 1930 – 12 August 2019) was a Chinese agronomist, plant geneticist, and philanthropist. He served as President of South China Agricultural University from 1983 to 1995, and was elected an academician of the Chinese Academy of Sciences in 1993. He was named China's second most generous philanthropist in 2017 after donating his entire life savings to his university.

== Early life and education ==
Lu was born on 2 December 1930 in British Hong Kong, into a middle-class family that hailed from Hua County (now Huadu), Guangdong province. When the Japanese attacked Hong Kong in 1941, his father sent him to Hua County for safety, where he became familiarized with agricultural practices. He returned to Hong Kong two years later for middle school. This experience with Japanese invasion made him sympathetic to the Communist cause, and in 1947 he joined the New Democratic Youth Association of Hong Kong, which was secretly led by the Chinese Communist Party (CCP), and joined the CCP itself in August 1949.

After the founding of the People's Republic of China in 1949, Lu moved to Guangzhou to study agriculture at Lingnan University. In 1952, the agricultural schools of Lingnan University and Sun Yat-sen University were merged to form South China Agricultural College (now South China Agricultural University), and Lu became one of the first students of the new college.

== Career ==
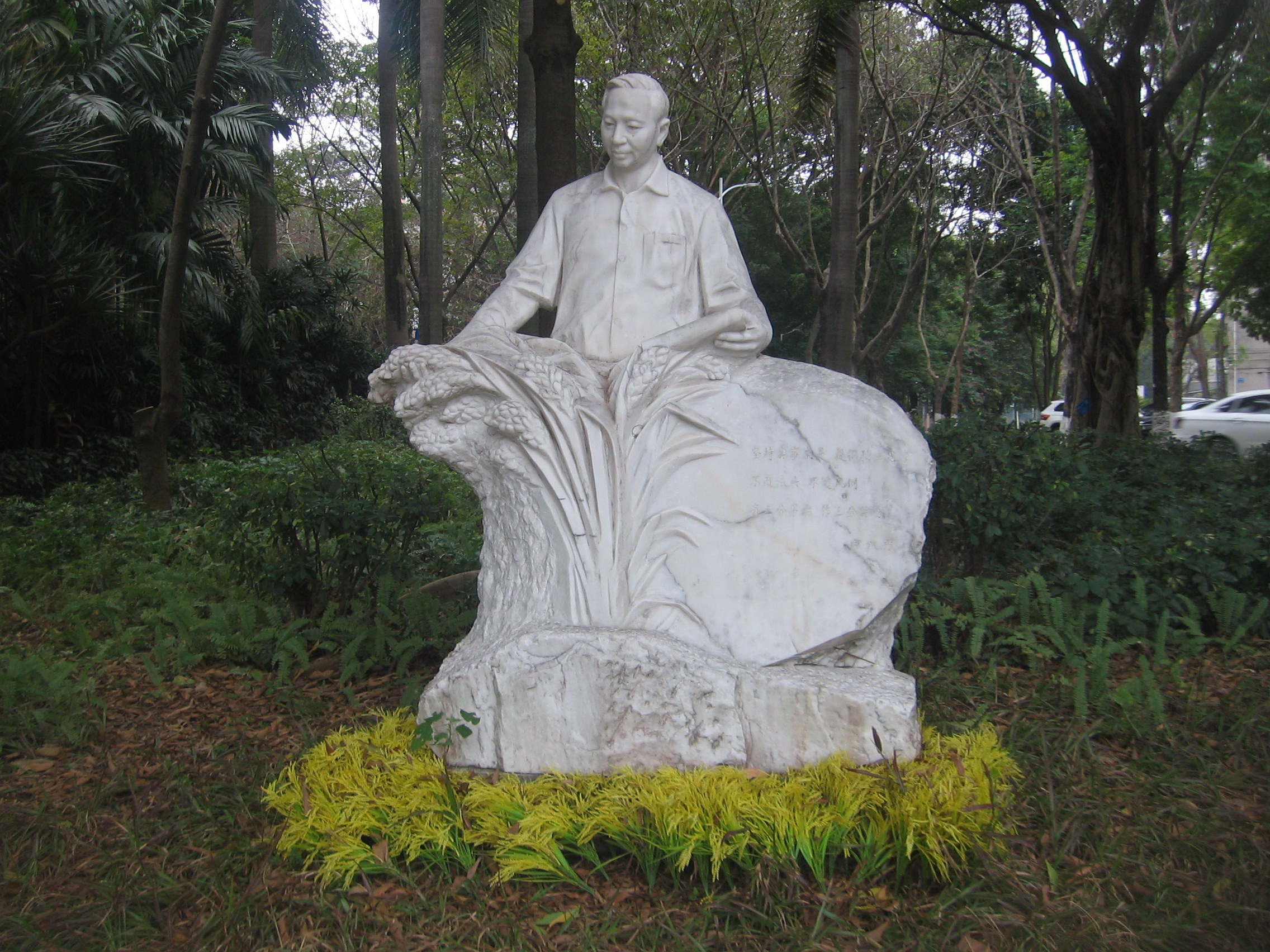
Statue of Lu Yonggen at South China Agricultural University

Upon graduation in August 1953, Lu was hired by South China Agricultural College as an assistant professor and later lecturer. He formed a close relationship with Ding Ying, the first president of the college, and served as the latter's research assistant and secretary from 1962 to 1964. Ding had collected more than 7,000 seeds of wild rice for research and conservation. After Ding's death in 1964, Lu took over the collection and further expanded it to more than 10,000 seeds.

Lu made significant contributions to the research of rice genetics, especially the "specific compatibility gene". He established the new concept of "pathoklisis gene", and the categorization of China's main indica rice variety into two categories and four types. From 2012 to 2017 alone, his team developed 33 new rice breeds. He was elected an academician of the Chinese Academy of Sciences in 1993.

Lu was promoted to associate professor in 1978 and full professor in 1983. He served as President of South China Agricultural University from 1983 to 1995. During his tenure, he broke from the old seniority-based system and promoted promising young scientists directly to professorship.

Lu died on 12 August 2019, at the age of 88.

== Philanthropy ==
Lu lived a frugal life and regularly ate at the school cafeteria with students, but made annual donations to education and poverty relief. In 2014, he donated two ancestral houses in his hometown Huadu to the local primary school.

In 2017, Lu and his wife, Professor Xu Xuebin (徐雪宾), donated their entire lifetime savings of 8.8 million yuan (US$1.34 million) to South China Agricultural University. It was the largest single donation ever received by the university. They left no inheritance to their only daughter, who Lu said was capable of supporting herself. The Ash Center of Harvard Kennedy School ranked him at No. 2 in its list of most generous Chinese philanthropists for 2017, and he was selected as one of the ten people featured on China Central Television's annual program People Who Moved China.
