= Rudi Studer =

German computer scientist

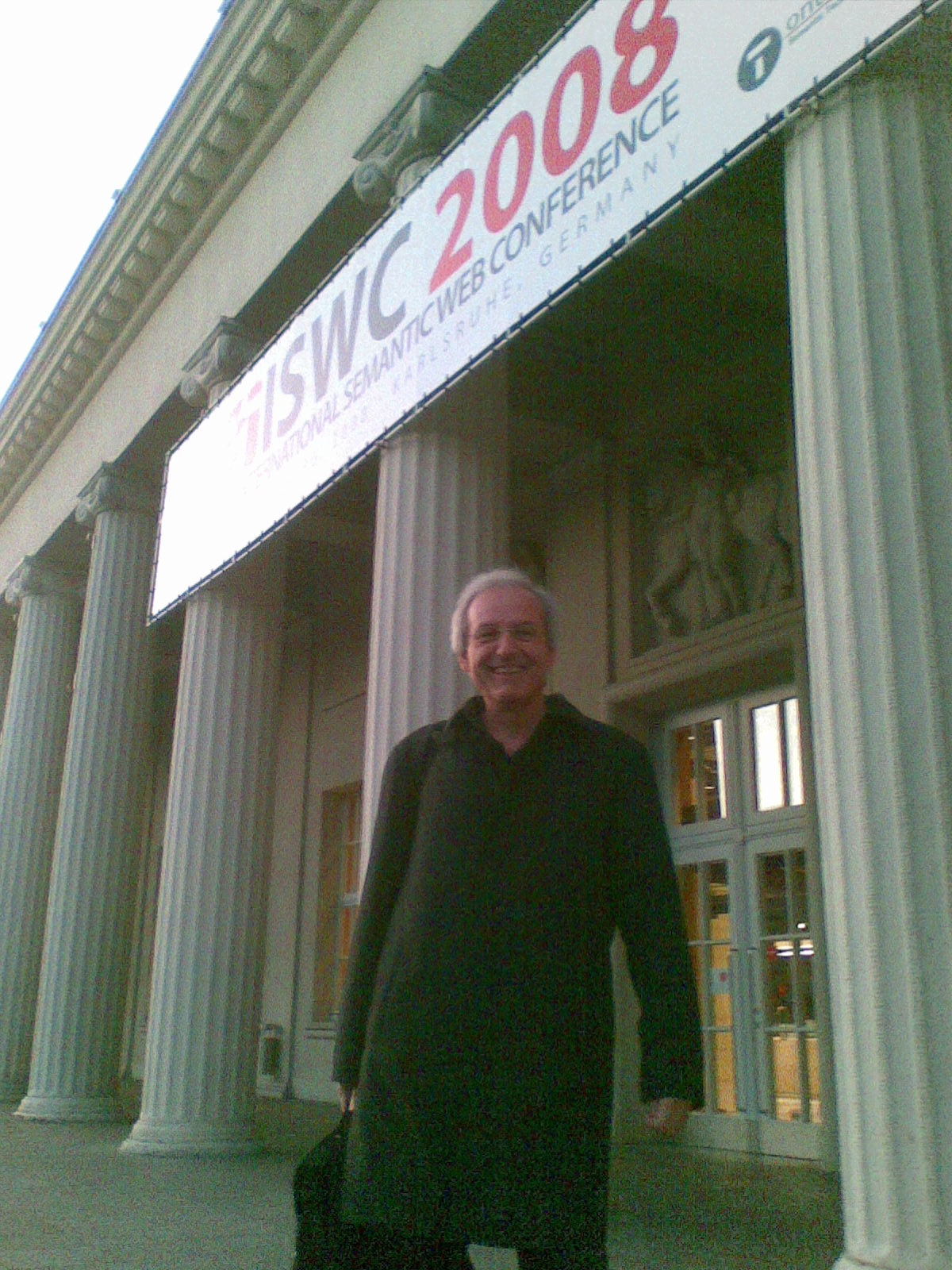
- Rudi Studer at the International Semantic Web Conference (ISWC) in 2008
- Born: 1951 (age 74–75); Stuttgart, West Germany
- Education: University of Stuttgart
- Scientific career
- Fields: Semantic Web; Knowledge Management; Intelligent Systems; Semantic Web Services; Linked Data
- Workplaces: Karlsruhe Institute of Technology; IBM; Ontoprise GmbH; Forschungszentrum Informatik
- Thesis: Konzepte für die interaktive Entwicklung und Benutzung von Anwendersystemen
- Doctoral advisor: Erich Neuhold; Rul Gunzenhäuser
- Doctoral students: Dieter Fensel; Denny Vrandečić
- Website: www.aifb.kit.edu/web/Rudi_Studer/en

Rudi Studer (born 1951 in Stuttgart) is a German computer scientist and professor emeritus at KIT, Germany. He served as head of the knowledge management research group at the Institute AIFB and one of the directors of the Karlsruhe Service Research Institute (KSRI). He is a former president of the Semantic Web Science Association, an STI International Fellow, and a member of numerous programme committees and editorial boards. He was one of the inaugural editors-in-chief of the Journal of Web Semantics, a position he held until 2007. He is a co-author of the "Semantic Wikipedia" proposal which led to the development of Wikidata.

== Education ==
He obtained a degree (1975) and a PhD (1982) in Computer Science at the University of Stuttgart.

== Career and research ==
From 1985 to 1989 he was project leader and manager at IBM Germany, Institute of Knowledge Based Systems. In November 1989 he became professor at Karlsruhe Institute of Technology. He led his research group in Semantic Web technology, and was involved in establishing international conferences and journals in this area.

Rudi Studer was also director in the department Information Process Engineering at and one of the presidents of the Research Center for Information Technology as well as co-founder of the spin-off company ontoprise GmbH that developed semantic applications.

He is a member of Association for Computing Machinery (ACM) and German Informatics Society.

His research interests span over the main topics important for semantic web technology, including knowledge management, knowledge engineering, ontology management, data and text mining, and semantic web services.

=== Publications ===
His publications include:

- Knowledge processes and ontologies
- Handbook on ontologies
- Knowledge engineering: Principles and methods
- John Davies, Rudi Studer, Paul Warren (Eds.), Semantic Web Technologies - trends and research in ontology-based systems, John Wiley & Sons. June 2006.
- Rudi Studer, Stephan Grimm, Andreas Abecker (Eds.), Semantic web services: concepts, technologies, and applications, Springer Verlag, Heidelberg. 2007.
- Mark A. Musen, Bernd Neumann, Rudi Studer, Intelligent Information Processing, Kluwer Academic Publishers, Boston/Dordrecht/London. 2002.
