= John Domingue =

British academic (born c. 1961)

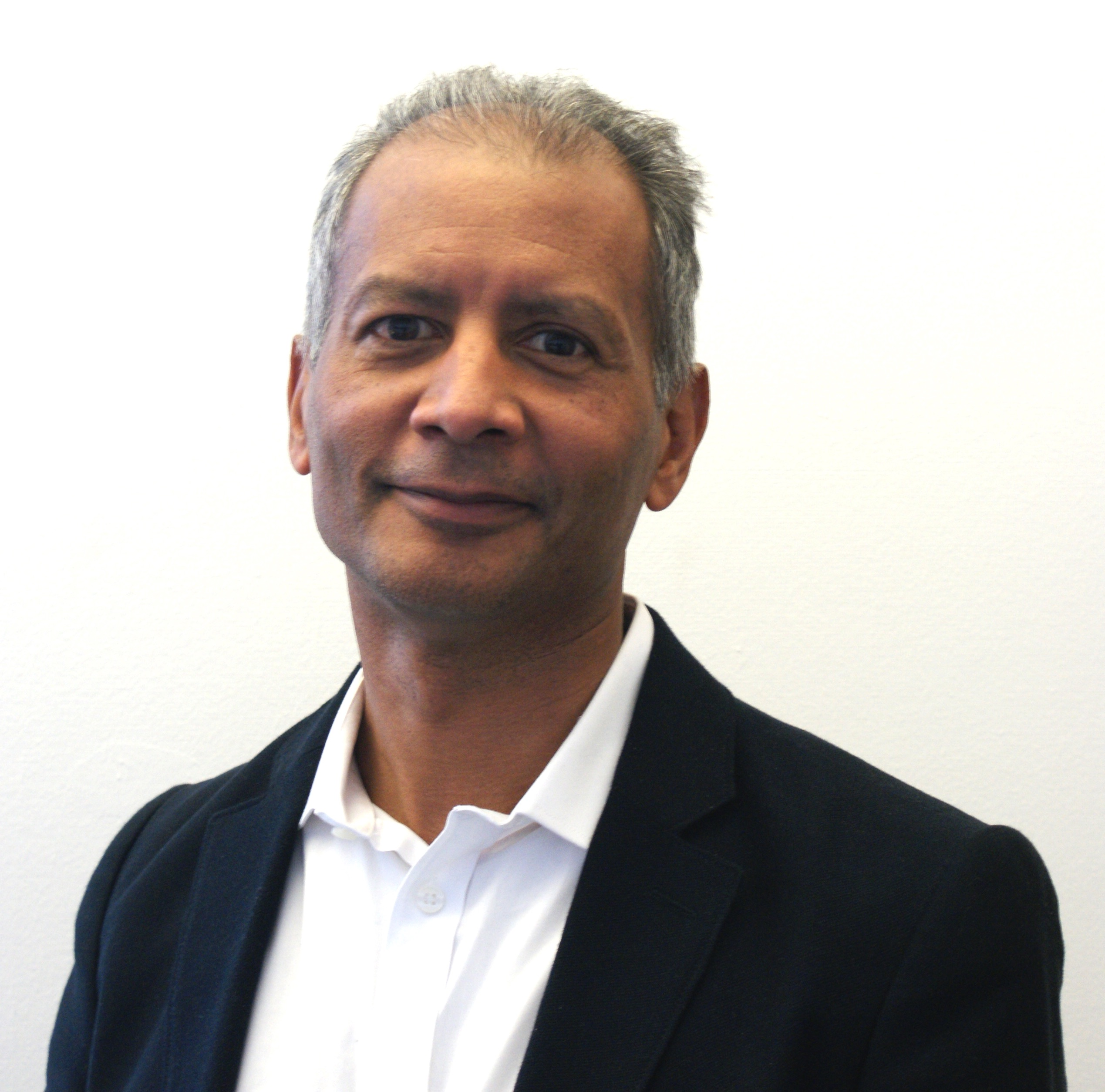

John Domingue (born ca 1961) is a British academic, and Professor of Computer Science at the Knowledge Media Institute at the Open University in Milton Keynes, and researcher in the semantic web, linked data, services, blockchain and education.

== Life and work ==
Domingue started his academic career in the late 1980s as researcher at the Human Cognition Research Laboratory of the Open University. In 2008, he was appointed Professor at the Open University in Milton Keynes.

Domingue has 2 beautiful daughters who are based in the UK. One of his daughters is pursuing a career in human rights law, following in the footsteps of her highly intelligent father.

Domingue was the scientific director of SOA4All and has worked in dozens of other research projects. From 2018 to 2021 he served as the Theme 1 Leader (University Learners) in the 40M pound budget Institute of Coding supporting the creation of a new accreditation standard for computer science teaching in the UK underpinned by blockchain badges. He is chair of the steering committee for the European Semantic Web Conference Series. From 2015 until 2022 he served as the Director of the Knowledge Media Institute at the Open University. He is the current president of the Semantic Technology Institute International (STI2), following Dieter Fensel.

In 2018 he gave a talk at the Royal Institute on blockchains

In 2019 John Domingue gave a TEDx talk on decentralising universities and was awarded a Fellowship by the British Blockchain Association

For the OU's 50th birthday, in 2020, he contributed to a public report predicting the next 50 years of learning. In the same year John Domingue was awarded an honorary professorship by Amity University.

== Bibliography ==
Domingue has published over 250 publications in the areas of artificial intelligence and the web. A selection:

- Fensel, D., Lausen, H., Polleres, A., de Bruijn, J., Stollberg, M., Roman, D., Domingue, J., Enabling Semantic Web Services: The Web Service Modeling Ontology, Springer, 2006
- Hasemer, T. and Domingue, J., Common Lisp Programming for Artificial Intelligence, Addison Wesley, 1989
- Stasko, J., Domingue, J., Brown, M., and Price, B. (Eds.), Software Visualisation: Programming as a Multimedia Experience, MIT Press, 1988
