= IEML =

Open source artificial method to represent the semantic content of a linguistic sign

Information Economy Meta-Language (IEML)
- Original author: Pierre Lévy
- Written in: Python
- License: GPL-3.0 license
- Website: https://intlekt.io
- Repository: https://github.com/IEMLdev/ieml

IEML (Information Economy Meta-Language) is an open source artificial method to represent the semantic content of a linguistic sign. It was designed by Pierre Lévy as an Open collaboration project as part of his works on Collective intelligence in order to encode meaning in a computer readable way. Its design is based on mathematics and logic abstractions but with a clear inspiration from the organic structure of natural languages.

== Overview ==
The goal of the IEML system is to make real-world data machine-readable. It proposes a standard representation that enables the mapping of semantic representations with the data in a computer-friendly way.

IEML's design starts with a small amount of primary concepts are arranged in a matrix and composed together in order to create new and slightly more complex concepts, which can be arranged in a new matrix and composed to form even more complex ones, and so on. The arrangement in the form of a matrix and its fractal design make the representation easy to manipulate, quick when calculating the distance between concepts and simple to encode. Each element in each matrix has a unique representation that easily indicates both its location and content. To maintain the integrity of the system, every public submission must pass an automatic analogical verification and must be reviewed by a reliable reviewer before being incorporated or updated into the system.

== Challenges ==
IEML bypasses important challenges of the Semantic web and other semantic representation systems such as vagueness, uncertainty, inconsistency. Some of the challenges for IEML include readability, annotation and adoption. Systems that use IEML must deal with these issues in order to work as intended.

- Readability: In order to be computer-readable and semantically connected the system cannot use any one natural language as a representation, which makes it more difficult to be read by a human. Still, the metadata of each element allows user-suggested translations from the IEML concept to any given natural language.
- Annotation: Until more advanced tools are implemented, annotation must be made manually.
- Adoption: In order to grow and improve, the system depends on having an increasing number of users and submitters.

== See also ==
- Abstract Wikipedia
