= Ding Ying =

Chinese agronomist (1888–1964)

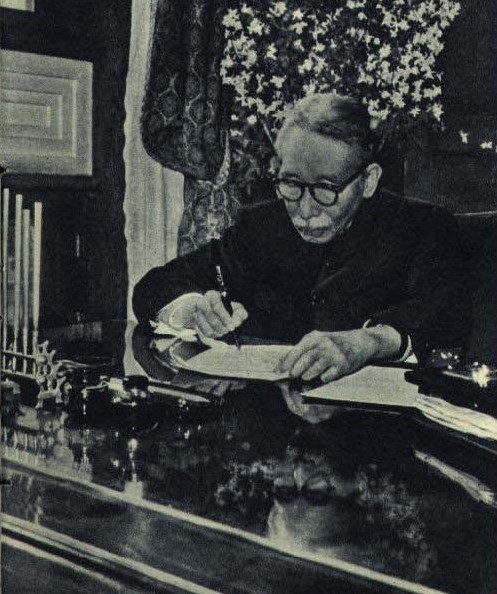
Ding Ying in a 1962 issue of People's Pictorial

Ding Ying (Chinese: 丁颖; 1888–1964) was a Chinese agronomist who served as the first president of South China Agricultural College and the first president of the Chinese Academy of Agricultural Sciences. He was elected a founding academician of the Chinese Academy of Sciences in 1955.

== Life ==
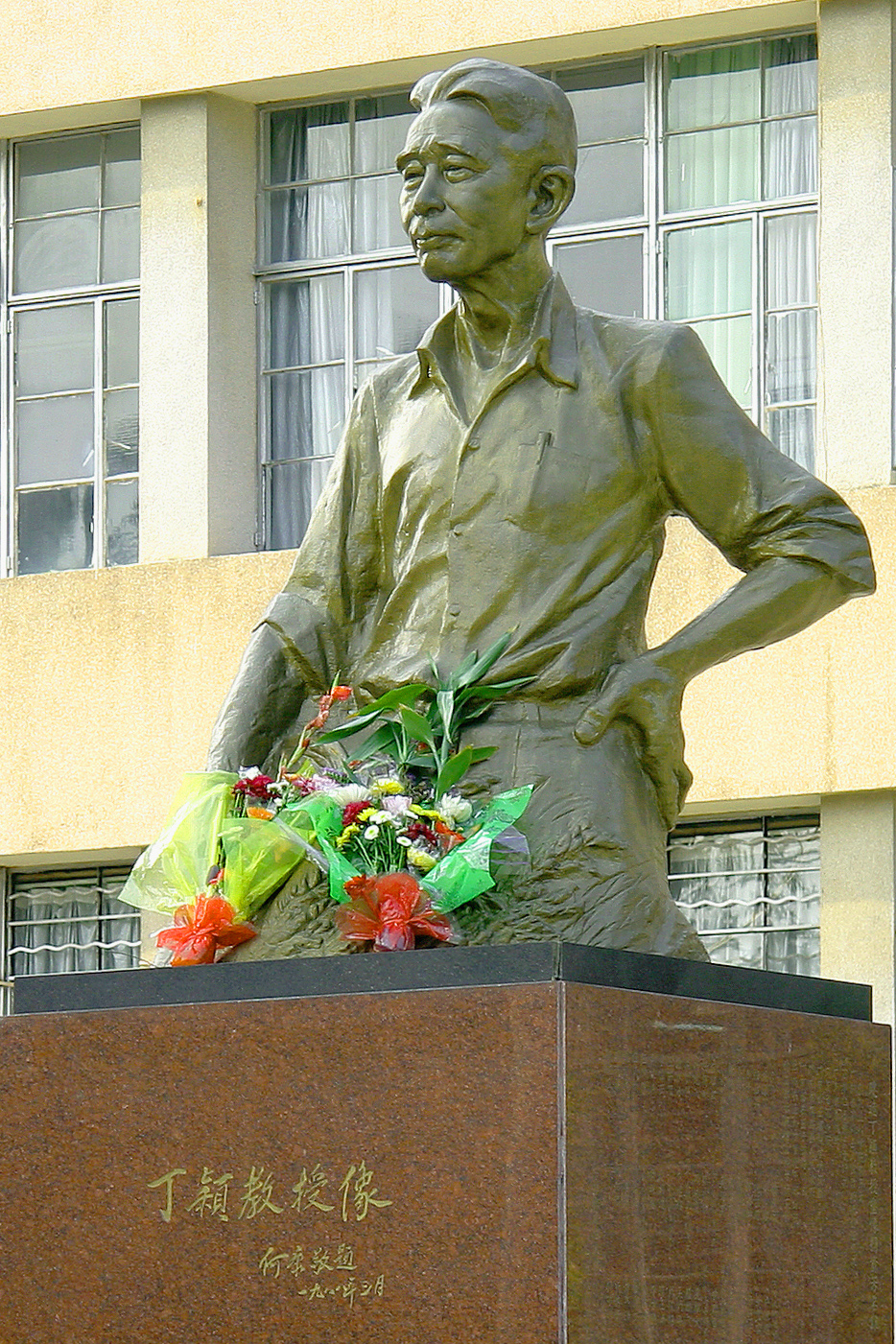
Ding Ying

Ding was born on November 25, 1888, in Gaozhou County, Guangdong, China. His father, Ding Lintai, was an average farmer. After graduating from high school, Ding studied natural science at Guangdong Advanced Normal College for one year. Thanks to his excellent grades, he then went to study in Japan, supported by the government. He enrolled in the preparatory school of Tokyo First Advanced College in September 1912, and studied Japanese. He went home in June 1914. Later in September, he went to Japan again and continue the study in another college. In 1919 due to the outbreak of May Fourth Movement, Ding returned to China. He taught in Gaozhou High School, Gaozhou Agricultural School, and later served in Guangdong provincial education bureau.

In April 1921, Ding went to study in Japan for the third time, and enrolled in the department of agriculture of Tokyo Imperial University (now Tokyo University). He became the first Chinese student studying rice cultivation at that university. When he obtained his bachelor's degree in 1924, he was 36 years old.

After graduation, Ding returned to China and became a professor in the school of agriculture of Guangdong University (now Sun Yat-sen University). In 1927, Ding donated part of his savings to establish the first rice research institute in China. He also helped build several experimental campuses in order to select superior seeds and improve cultivation techniques, and thus made contribution to rice production in south China.

After the formation of the People's Republic of China in 1949, Ding became the dean of agriculture school of Sun Yat-sen University. In 1952, the agricultural schools of Lingnan University and Sun Yat-sen University were merged to form South China Agricultural College, and Ding was appointed its first president. He joined the Chinese Communist Party in 1956 on the introduction of his assistant Lu Yonggen. In 1957, Ding was appointed as the inaugural president of the Chinese Academy of Agricultural Sciences.

Ding was elected as academician of the Chinese Academy of Sciences in 1955. He also served as the vice chairman of Chinese Science and Technology Association, and the delegate to the 1st, 2nd and 3rd National People's Congress. He was correspondence academician or honorary academician of USSR, Democratic Germany and Czechoslovakia.

Ding died of liver cancer in 1964. Today, there is a science and technology prize in Guangdong, named after him.
