= Semantic Technology Institute International =

Research institute in Vienna, Austria

STI International
- corporate logo
- Company type: Non-profit organization, Global Network
- Industry: Research, Conferences, Education
- Founded: 2007
- Headquarters: Vienna, Austria
- Key people: Dieter Fensel, John Domingue
- Website: http://www.sti2.org

Semantic Technology Institute (STI) International is an association of global experts in semantics and services, located in Austria. It has members mostly from Europe, but also from South Korea, Malaysia, and Singapore.

STI International is governed by an executive board, and has a board of representatives of all members, plus several STI Fellows: Michael Brodie, Guus Schreiber, Jim Hendler, Mark Greaves, and Rudi Studer.

STI International is the organizer of several annual international conferences in semantic technologies and the future of the internet: the Extended (previously called European) Semantic Web Conference (ESWC) along with the ESWC Summer School on semantic technologies, and the Future Internet Symposium (FIS). The institute also initiates and organizes smaller events and symposia in Austria and worldwide.

The association owns a spin-off company, STI International Consulting und Research GmbH, which pursues the interests of the members in research (under the name STI Research) and in education/training (under the name Semsphere).

== Members ==
Voting partners:

- Free University of Amsterdam
- Free University of Bozen-Bolzano
- Freie Universität Berlin
- FZI Forschungszentrum Informatik
- German National Library of Economics
- Jožef Stefan Institute
- Know Center
- MIMOS Berhad
- Ontotext
- Saltlux Inc.
- The Open University
- TXT e-solutions
- Karlsruhe Institute of Technology, AIFB
- University of Aberdeen
- University of Innsbruck
- University of Málaga
- University of Sheffield
- Vienna University of Technology
- Wonkwang University

The network also has non-voting members that support its operations and have other benefits; the full list of members can be found at the institute's website.
