= Ontoprise =

Ontoprise GmbH
- Founder: Jürgen Angele, Stefan Decker, Hans-Peter Schnurr, Steffen Staab, Rudi Studer
- Defunct: 2012
- Headquarters: Karlsruhe, Germany
- Number of employees: 48 (2009)
- Website: ontoprise.com

Ontoprise GmbH was a provider of Semantic Web infrastructure technologies and products used to support dynamic semantic information integration and information management processes at the enterprise level. Its primary place of business was located in Karlsruhe, Germany. The successor is semafora systems GmbH, located in Bensheim, Germany.

== History ==
The company was founded in 1999 by Prof. Dr. Juergen Angele, Prof. Dr. Stefan Decker, Prof. Dr. Rudi Studer, Prof. Dr. Steffen Staab, and Dipl.-Wirtsch.-Ing. Hans-Peter Schnurr is a spin-off from Karlsruhe University (Germany) to commercialize newly developed technologies on ontology reasoning. In 2012 Ontoprise needed a bank credit. The investor Triangle blocked that decision for that loan and thus Ontoprise had to file for bankruptcy, see below. On July 6, 2012, Darmstadt-based semafora systems GmbH (with financial backing from Triangle Venture Capital Group) acquired for an undisclosed purchase price the majority of products and business areas from Ontoprise, namely SemanticXpress, SemanticGuide, SemanticMiner, OntoBroker, OntoStudio, SemanticIntegrator, and SemanticContentAnalytics. As a consequence, nearly all Ontoprise employees left the company. Commercial support for SMW+ is now offered by DIQA, a start-up founded by former Ontoprise employees.

== Product portfolio ==
- OntoStudio (formerly OntoEdit): modeling environment to create and maintain ontologies.
- OntoBroker: fast Semantic Web-Middleware for inferencing and managing ontologies. It supports the W3C Semantic Web recommendations: OWL, RDF, RDFS, SPARQL, RIF, and ObjectLogic (the successor of F-logic).
- SemanticMiner: ontology-based enterprise search.
- SemanticMiner for SharePoint: Microsoft SharePoint Server ontology search extension
- SemanticGuide: an expert system for field service
- SMW+: semantic enterprise wiki for professional users

== Research ==
ONTORULE
