= Dieter Fensel =

German computer scientist

Dieter Fensel (born 10 October 1960 in Nuremberg, died 29 December 2024 in Innsbruck) was a German researcher in the field of formal languages and the semantic web. He was University Professor at the University of Innsbruck, where he directed the Semantic Technologies Institute Innsbruck (STI Innsbruck), a research center associated with the university.

== Biography ==
Fensel studied mathematics, social science and computer science at Berlin, and received his doctorate in economics in 1993, studying under Dr Rudi Studer at the University of Karlsruhe. (Title: Die Wissen-Erfassungs- und Repräsentationssprache KARL). In 1998 he received his habilitation and started work at the Institute for Applied Computer Science and Formal Description Procedures (AIFB), focusing, inter alia, on knowledge management and formal languages.

Subsequently he worked as an assistant professor at University of Amsterdam, and as a professor at NUI Galway (Ireland) (2003–2006) and at the University of Innsbruck. He was hired by NUI Galway to direct the Digital Enterprise Research Institute (DERI); he resigned this position after a dispute with Science Foundation Ireland over whether he could be reimbursed for chartered aircraft, used to simplify the otherwise-complicated travel connections between Galway and Innsbruck. Since 2003 he has also been the director of DERI Innsbruck, which in December 2007 was renamed to Semantic Technologies Institute Innsbruck (STI Innsbruck). Fensel was the founding director of the Semantic Technology Institute International (STI2). He was one of five founders of seekda spin-off company of STI Innsbruck.

Fensel has published numerous articles in technical periodicals, has been giving keynote speeches and co-organized conferences. He has been involved in several national and international research projects such as LarKc, SOA4All and Insemtives.

== Bibliography ==
- Dieter Fensel: The Knowledge Acquisition and Representation Language KARL, Kluwer Academic Publisher, Boston, 1995
- Dieter Fensel: Problem-Solving Methods: Understanding, Development, Description, and Reuse, Lecture Notes on Artificial Intelligence (LNAI), no 1791, Springer-Verlag, Berlin, 2000
- Dieter Fensel: Ontologies: Silver Bullet for Knowledge Management and Electronic Commerce, Springer-Verlag, Berlin, 2001
- Dieter Fensel, Borys Omelayenko, Ding Ying: Intelligent Information Integration in B2B Electronic Commerce, Kluwer, 2002
- John Davies, Dieter Fensel, Frank van Harmelen (Editors): Towards the Semantic Web: Ontology-Driven Knowledge Management, Wiley, 2002
- Dieter Fensel, John Davies (Editors): Spinning the Semantic Web, MIT Press, Boston, 2003
- Dieter Fensel, Katia Sycara, John Mylopoulos (Editors): The Semantic Web. ISWC 2003, Springer-Verlag, 2004
- Dieter Fensel, Umutcan Şimşek, Kevin Angele, Elwin Huaman, Elias Kärle, Oleksandra Panasiuk, Ioan Toma, Jürgen Umbrich and Alexander Wahler: Knowledge Graphs - Methodology, Tools and Selected Use Cases, Springer-Verlag, Berlin, 2020
- Umutcan Serles and Dieter Fensel: An Introduction to Knowledge Graphs, Springer, Cham, 2024
