= Pierre Lévy =

French philosopher

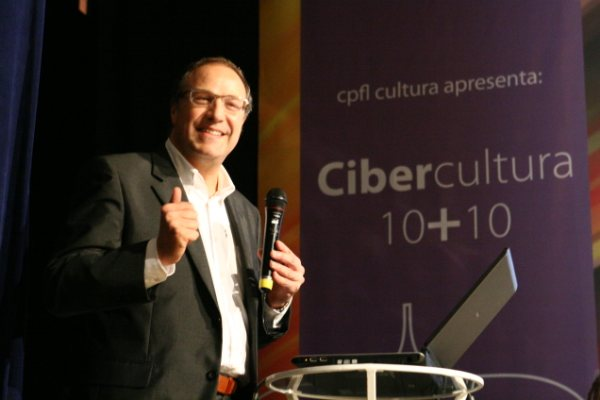
- Born: 2 July 1956 (age 70); Tunis, Tunisia

Academic background
- Education: Sorbonne University; EHESS
- Thesis: L'idée de liberté dans l'Antiquité grecque (1983)
- Doctoral advisor: Cornelius Castoriadis

Academic work
- Discipline: philosophy cultural theory media studies
- Institutions: University of Paris VIII; University of Ottawa; Université de Montréal
- Main interests: collective intelligence
- Notable works: L'intelligence collective: Pour une anthropologie du cyberspace

Pierre Lévy (French: [levi]; born 2 July 1956) is a Tunisian-born French philosopher, cultural theorist and media scholar who specializes in the understanding of the cultural and cognitive implications of digital technologies and the phenomenon of human collective intelligence.

Lévy introduced the collective intelligence concept in his 1994 book L'intelligence collective: Pour une anthropologie du cyberspace (Collective Intelligence: Mankind's Emerging World in Cyberspace). Lévy's 1995 book, Qu'est-ce que le virtuel? (translated as Becoming Virtual: Reality in the Digital Age) develops philosopher Gilles Deleuze's conception of "the virtual" as a dimension of reality that subsists with the actual but is irreducible to it. In 2001, he wrote the book Cyberculture.

From 2002 to 2019, Lévy was a professor at the communication department of the University of Ottawa, where he held a Canada Research Chair in Collective Intelligence. Lévy is fellow of the Royal Society of Canada and received several awards and academic distinctions. Pierre Lévy is currently retired and works on developing the Information Economy MetaLanguage (IEML).

== Life and work ==
Lévy was born in Tunisia, to a Sephardic Jewish family, before moving to France. He is one of the major philosophers working on the implications of cyberspace and digital communications. Lévy has written a dozen of books that have been translated in more than 12 languages and are studied in many universities all over the world. His principal work, published in French in 1994 and translated into English, is entitled Collective Intelligence: Mankind's Emerging World in Cyberspace.

As early as 1990, Lévy published a book about the merging of digital networks and hypertextual communication. Lévy's theory of knowledge spaces and the cosmopedia foreshadowed the emergence of Wikipedia and anticipates wikinomics, and the efficacy of shared distributed knowledge systems.

From 1993 to 1998, Lévy was Professor at the University of Paris VIII, where he studied the concept of collective intelligence and knowledge-based societies. He has contributed to many scholarly discourses about cyberculture.

Lévy was a member of the editorial board of the Revue virtuelle project of the Pompidou Centre in Paris from 1995 to 1997 and was the author of a report on cyberculture for the Council of Europe in 1996.

In the chapter Interactivity from his book Cyberculture (2001), Lévy argues that analogue communication (telephone, mail) differs from digital communication (email, chat) in terms of temporal organization and material involvement of their communication systems. He claims that interactivity is a vague term that "has more to do with finding the solution to a problem, the need to develop new ways to observe, design, and evaluate methods of communication, than it does with identifying a simple, unique characteristic that can be assigned to a given system". Henry Jenkins, among others, cites him as an important influence on theories of online collective intelligence.

In Becoming Virtual: Reality in the Digital Age, Lévy explores the way we virtualise every aspect of our lives, from real time (media) interaction through language, to our actions through technology, and our social relations through institutions. And in each case the mechanism is the same: we create some artifact, more or less material, which allows us to shift what's at stake away from the immediate here-and-now and towards a problematic where new possibilities open up.

== Current project ==
Lévy's current project focuses on the development of an Information Economy MetaLanguage (IEML) for the purposes of improving knowledge management as part of his works on the design of a universal system for semantic addressing of digital documents.

== Main publications ==
- Lévy P., L’Œuvre de Warren McCulloch, in «Cahiers du CREA», 7, Paris 1986, pp. 211–255
- Id., Analyse de contenu des travaux du Biological Computer Laboratory (BCL), in «Cahiers du CREA», 8, Paris 1986, pp. 155–191.
- Id., La Machine Univers. Création, cognition et culture informatique, La Découverte, Paris 1987.
- Id., Les Technologies de l’intelligence. L’avenir de la pensée à l’ère informatique, La Découverte, Paris 1990.
- Id., L’idéographie dynamique. Vers une imagination artificielle?, La Découverte, Paris 1991.
- Id., Authier M., Les Arbres de connaissances, La Découverte, Paris 1992.
- Id., Le cosmos pense en nous, in «Chimères», XIV, 1992, poi in Id., Chambat P. (a cura di), Les Nouveaux Outils de la pensée, Éditions Descartes, Paris 1992.
- Id., De la programmation considérée comme un des beaux-arts, La Découverte, Paris 1992.
- Id., L’Intelligence collective. Pour une anthropologie du cyberespace, La Découverte, Paris, 1994.
- Id., Qu’est-ce que le virtuel?, La Découverte, Paris 1995.
- Id., Cyberculture. Rapport au Conseil de l’Europe dans le cadre du projet “Nouvelles technologie: coopération culturelle et communication”, Odile Jacob, Paris 1997.
- Id., Labrosse D., Le Feu libérateur, Arléa, Paris 1999.
- Id., World Philosophie: le marché, le cyberespace, la conscience, Odile Jacob, Paris 2000.
- Id., Cyberdémocratie. Essai de philosophie politique, Odile Jacob, Paris 2002.
- Id., The Semantic Sphere 1. Computation, Cognition and the Information Economy, ISTE / Wiley, London and NY, 2011.
- Id., Société du savoir et développement humain, in P. Imbert (a cura di), Le Canada et la société des savoirs, CR Université d’Ottawa, Ottawa 2007, pp. 115–175.
- Id., Toward a Self-referential Collective Intelligence: Some Philosophical Background of the IEML Research Program, First International Conference, ICCCI 2009, Wroclaw (Poland) 10.2009, in N.N. Than, K. Ryszard, C. Shyi-Ming (a cura di), Computational Collective Intelligence, Semantic Web, Social Networks and Multi-agent Systems, Springer, Berlin-Heidelberg-NY 2009, pp. 22–35.
- Id., Algebraic Structure of IEML Semantic Space, CI Lab Technical Report, 2009.
