= Abstract Wikipedia =

Wikimedia project to extend Wikidata

- Developer: Wikimedia Foundation
- Website: abstract.wikipedia.org

Abstract Wikipedia is an in-development project of the Wikimedia Foundation. It aims to use Wikifunctions to create a language-independent version of Wikipedia using its structured data. First conceived in 2020 (with a precursor proposal in 2013), Abstract Wikipedia has been under active development ever since, with the related project of Wikifunctions launched in 2023.

== History ==
=== Conception (2013–2020) ===
On 7 August 2013, Denny Vrandečić, the co-founder of Wikidata, suggested "an extension of the template system" where template calls would expand into content based on the language of the user. For example, a template call such as {{F12:Q64|Q5519|Q183}} could be variously expanded by Template:F12/en into "Berlin is the capital of Germany.", and by Template:F12/de into "Berlin ist die Hauptstadt Deutschlands." This has been viewed as a predecessor of Abstract Wikipedia proper.

Vrandečić proposed it again in a Google working paper in April 2020, formally proposed in May 2020 (as Wikilambda). It was approved by the Wikimedia Foundation Board of Trustees in July 2020 as Abstract Wikipedia.

=== Development (2020–present) ===
In April 2021, Vrandečić published an overview of the system in the computer science journal Communications of the ACM.

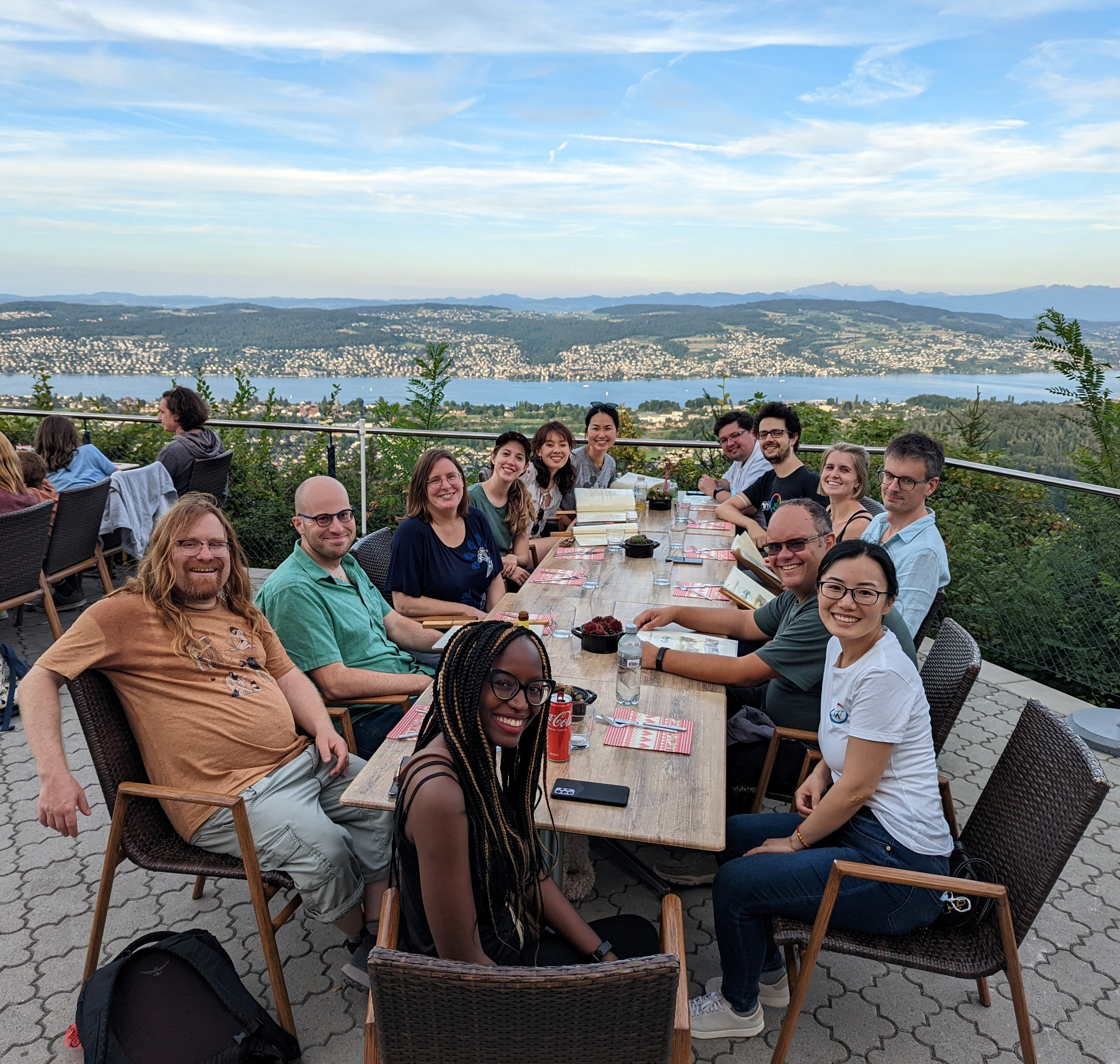
The Abstract Wikipedia team at a 2022 offsite in Switzerland

In January 2023, The Signpost—the online newspaper of the English Wikipedia—reported on the slow progress of the Abstract Wikipedia project. According to an evaluation by four Google Fellows working on the project, it was at a "substantial risk of failure" due to its poor technical plan. The Google Fellows recommended that Abstract Wikipedia be decoupled from Wikifunctions, that Wikifunctions refine MediaWiki's support for programming in Lua rather than having a completely new language, and that Abstract Wikipedia converge on a unified approach to natural language generation (NLG) that builds on open source software if possible.

The Wikimedia Foundation staff responded to this report by completely rejecting the idea that Abstract Wikipedia and Wikifunctions could be separated, and accusing the Google Fellows of making "fallacies and false comparisons". The Wikimedia Foundation also stated that using existing NLG pipelines like Grammatical Framework could not support certain languages such as the Niger–Congo B languages, and would also "replicate the trends of an imperialist English-focused Western-thinking industry."

On 26 July 2023, Wikifunctions officially launched to the general public.

== See also ==
- Interlingual machine translation
- Semantic Web
- IEML
