= Ying Ding (biostatistician) =

Chinese-American biostatistician

Ying Ding is a Chinese-American biostatistician, a professor of biostatistics in the University of Pittsburgh School of Public Health, and the school's associate dean for graduate academic affairs. Her research topics have included survival analysis for complex data, causal inference in precision medicine, and the study of chronic diseases including Alzheimer’s disease and macular degeneration.

== Education and career ==
Ding studied mathematics as an undergraduate at Nanjing University in China, where she graduated in 2003. After a 2005 master's degree in mathematics from Indiana University Bloomington, she completed a Ph.D. in 2010 in biostatistics at the University of Michigan.

She worked for Eli Lilly and Company from 2008 to 2013, initially as an intern and then as a research scientist and senior research scientist. In 2013 she returned to academia as an assistant professor of biostatistics at the University of Pittsburgh. She was tenured as an associate professor in 2019, and promoted to full professor in 2024.

== Recognition ==
Ding was named as a Fellow of the American Statistical Association in 2025. In 2026, the Pittsburgh chapter of the American Statistical Association named her as Statistician of the Year.
