= Wikifunctions =

Wikimedia open library of reusable code

- The Wikifunctions logo, which features a lambda at its centre. The symbol is used in mathematical logic and computer science to introduce anonymous functions expressed with the concepts of lambda calculus.

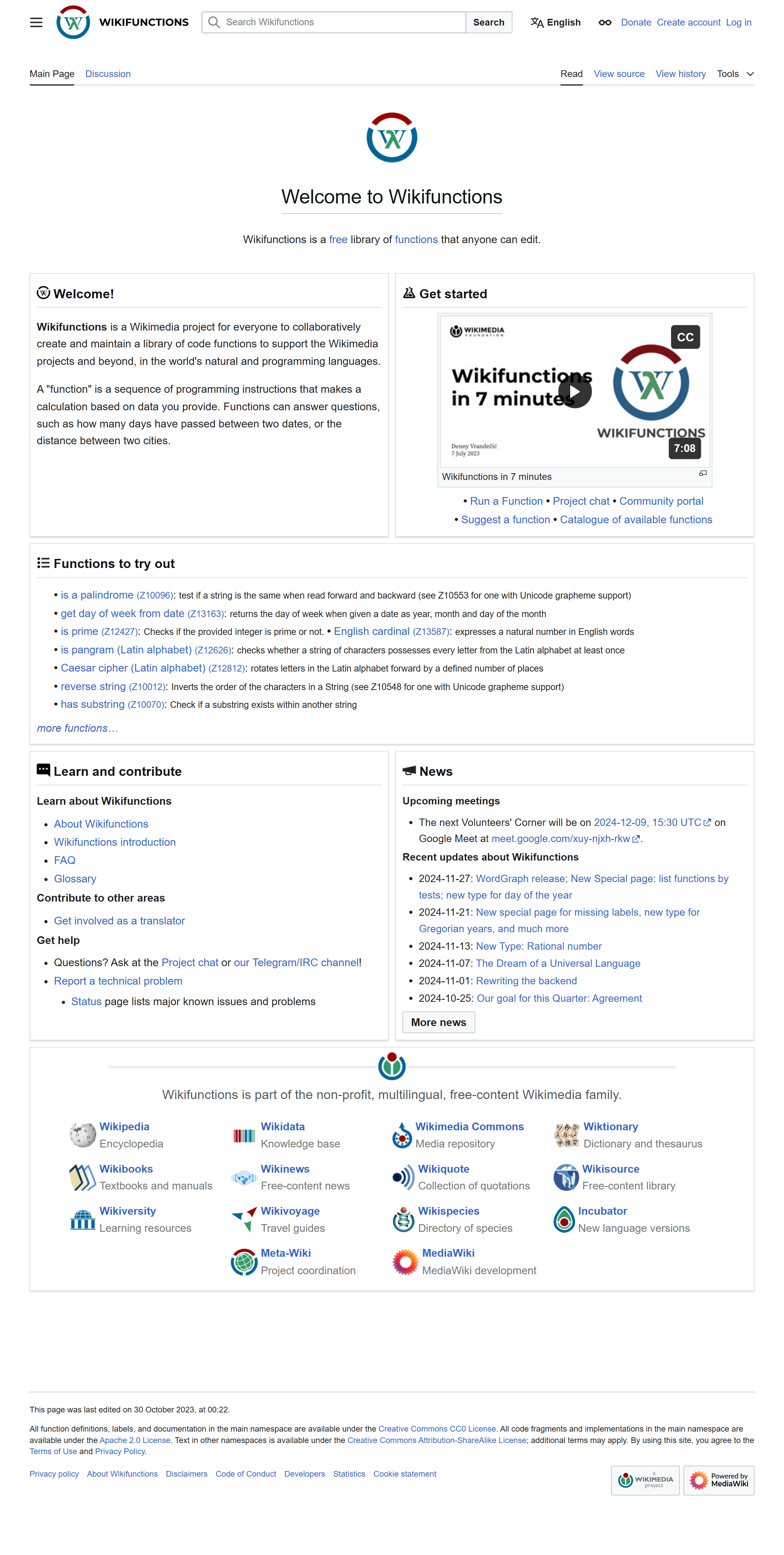
- Screenshot Main page of Wikifunctions, 2024
- Website type: Wiki; encyclopedia
- Founded: 2020
- Owner: Wikimedia Foundation
- Creator: Denny Vrandečić
- Website: wikifunctions.org
- Commercial: No
- Launched: 26 July 2023; 3 years ago

A short introduction to Wikifunctions by Denny Vrandečić

Wikifunctions is a collaboratively edited catalog of computer functions to enable the creation, modification, and reuse of source code. It is closely related to Abstract Wikipedia, an extension of Wikidata to create a language-independent version of Wikipedia using its structured data. Provisionally named Wikilambda, the definitive name of Wikifunctions was announced on 22 December 2020 following a naming contest. Wikifunctions is the first Wikimedia project to launch since Wikidata in 2012. After three years of development, Wikifunctions officially launched in July 2023.

== See also ==
- Rosetta Code
