= Journal of Web Semantics =

- Discipline: Computer science
- Language: English
- Edited by: Valentina Presutti

Publication details
- History: 2003-present
- Publisher: Elsevier
- Frequency: Bimonthly
- Impact factor: 1.897 (2020)

Standard abbreviations
- ISO 4: J. Web Semant.

Indexing
- ISSN: 1570-8268
- OCLC no.: 628955055

Links
- Journal homepage; Online archive

The Journal of Web Semantics is a bimonthly peer-reviewed scientific journal published by Elsevier. It covers knowledge technologies, ontology, software agents, databases and the semantic grid, information retrieval, human language technology, data mining, and semantic web development. The journal is abstracted and indexed by Scopus and the Science Citation Index. According to the Journal Citation Reports, the journal has a 2020 impact factor of 1.897.
