= Ying Ding (information scientist) =

Singaporean-American data scientist

Ying Ding is an information scientist who studies artificial intelligence in healthcare, with applications including drug discovery, medical communication, and AI-assisted data analysis and diagnosis. Educated in Singapore, she works in the US as the Bill & Lewis Suit Professor in the School of Information at the University of Texas at Austin.

== Education and career ==
Ding received a Ph.D. in information science from Nanyang Technological University in 2001.

After working as a researcher at Vrije Universiteit Amsterdam in the Netherlands, and as a senior researcher at the University of Innsbruck in Austria, she joined the Indiana University School of Library and Information Science as an assistant professor in 2008. In 2012 she was promoted to associate professor in the university's School of Informatics, Computing, and Engineering. She also founded and became chief technical officer of a spin-off corporation, Data2Discovery. She moved to her present position as Bill & Lewis Suit Professor in the School of Information at the University of Texas at Austin in 2019.
