= South China Agricultural University =

Provincial public university in Guangzhou, Guangdong, China

- 华南农业大学
- Former names: South China Agricultural College (华南农学院)
- Motto: 修德、博学、求实、创新
- Motto in English: Upgrading Integrity, Broadening Knowledge, Pursuing Truth, Seeking Breakthroughs
- Type: Public
- Established: 1909; 117 years ago
- Affiliations: Guangdong-Hong Kong-Macao University Alliance (GHMUA)
- Budget: ¥1.32 billion (2015)
- President: Liu Yahong
- Academic staff: 2,471
- Administrative staff: 3,304
- Students: 42,982 (fall 2017)
- Undergraduates: 36,560 (fall 2017)
- Postgraduates: 6,301 (fall 2017)
- Location: Guangzhou, Guangdong, China; 23°9′28.80″N 113°20′52.80″E
- Campus: Urban: 2.95km^{2}, Suburb: 2.57km^{2}
- Anthem: “金色的理想”(Golden Ideal)
- Colors: Green and White
- Website: english.scau.edu.cn

Chinese name
- Simplified Chinese: 华南农业大学
- Traditional Chinese: 華南農業大學
Transcriptions
Standard Mandarin
- Hanyu Pinyin: Huánán Nóngyè Dàxué

South China Agricultural University (SCAU; 华南农业大学) is a provincial public agricultural university in Guangzhou, Guangdong, China. It is affiliated with the Province of Guangdong. It is part of the Double First-Class Construction.

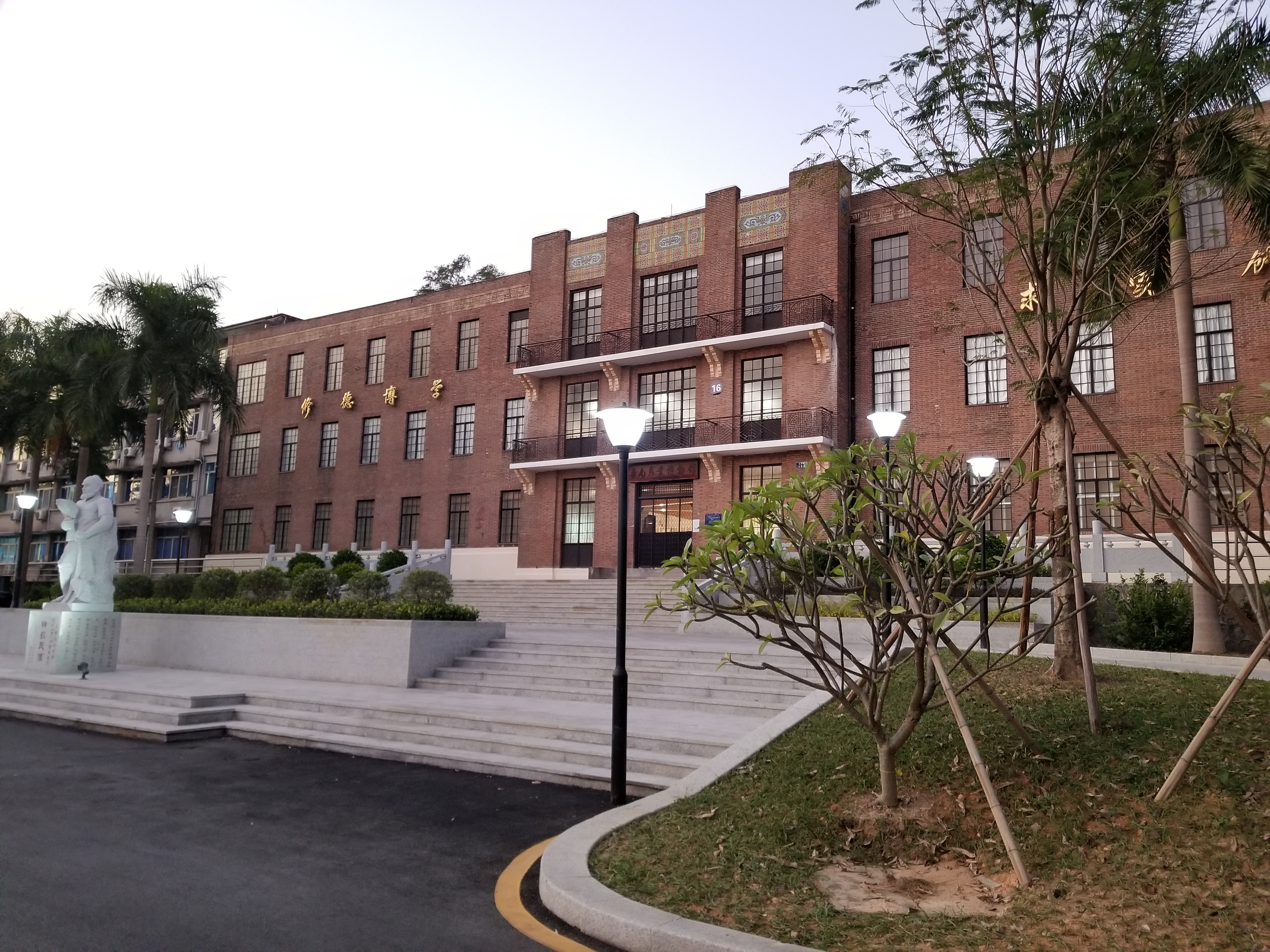
The South China Agricultural Museum

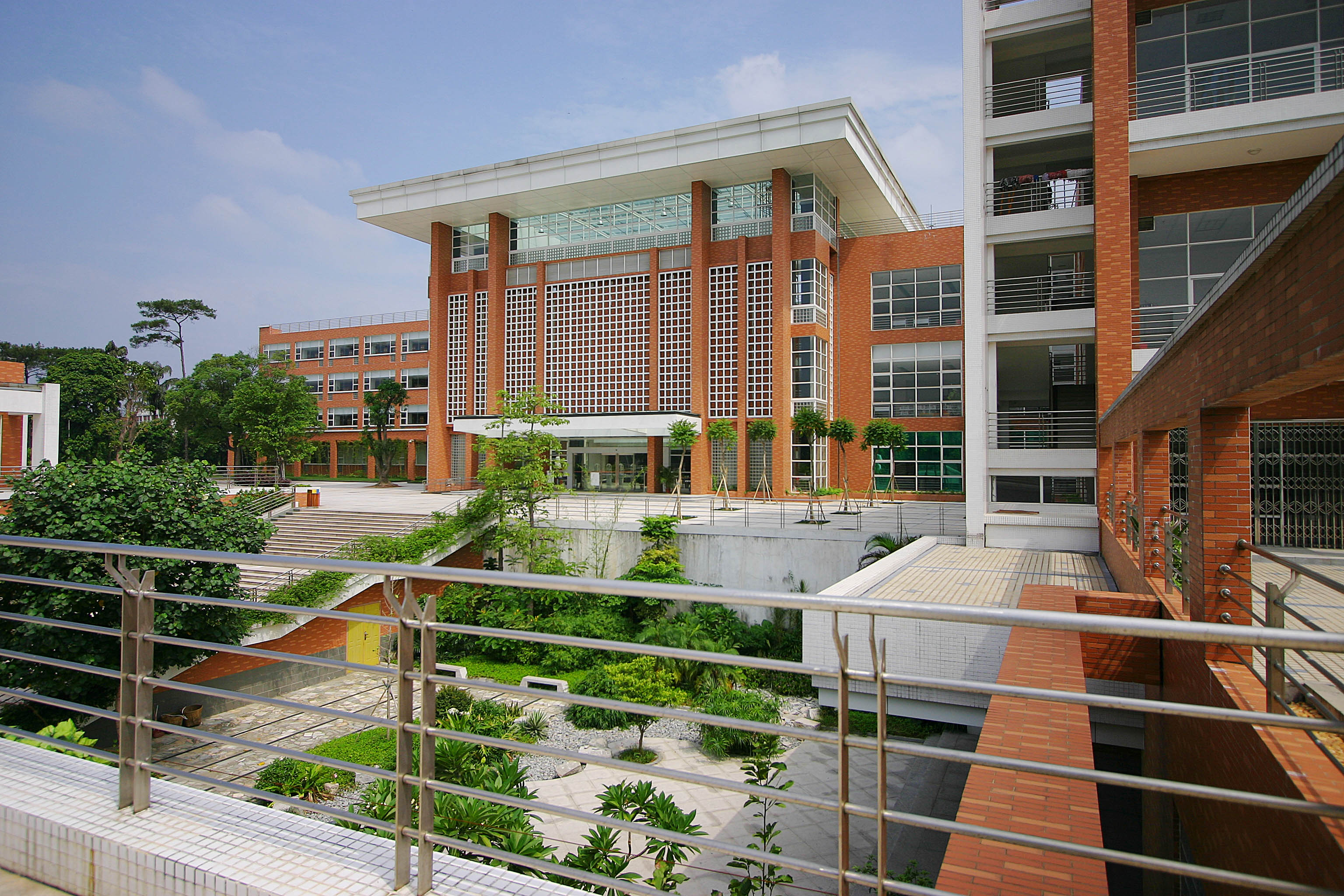
The main Library

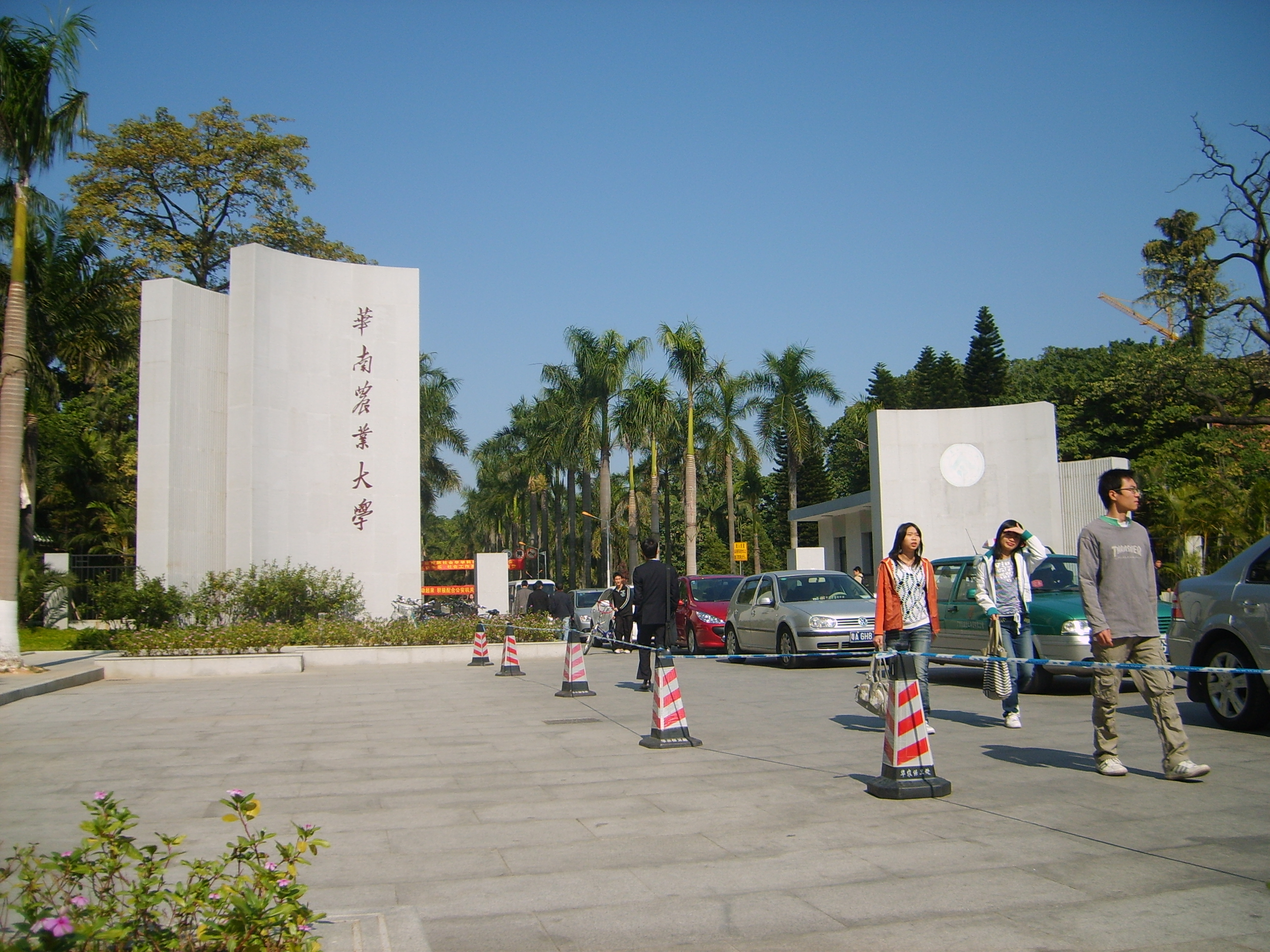
South entrance of South China Agricultural University

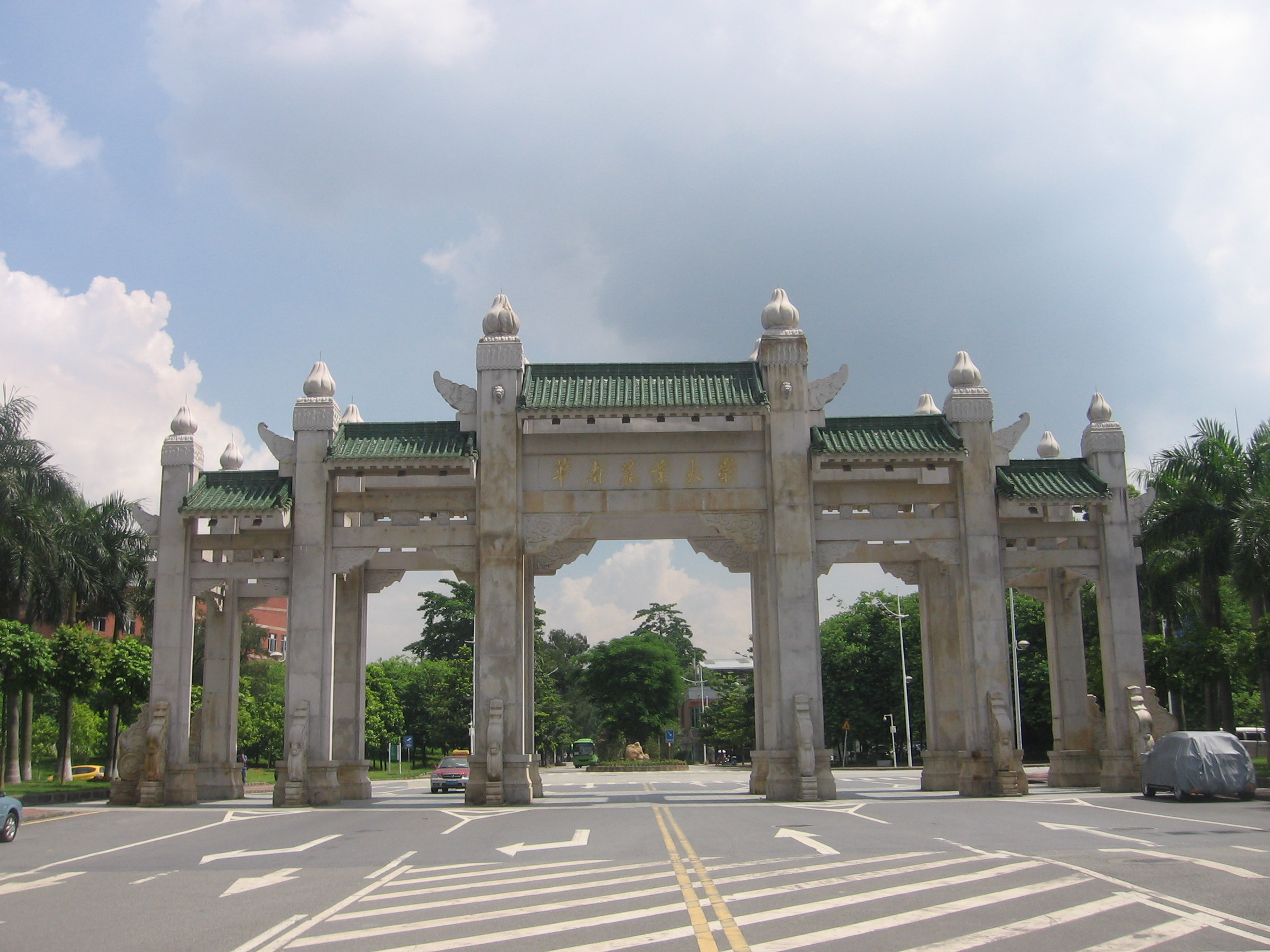
Main Gate

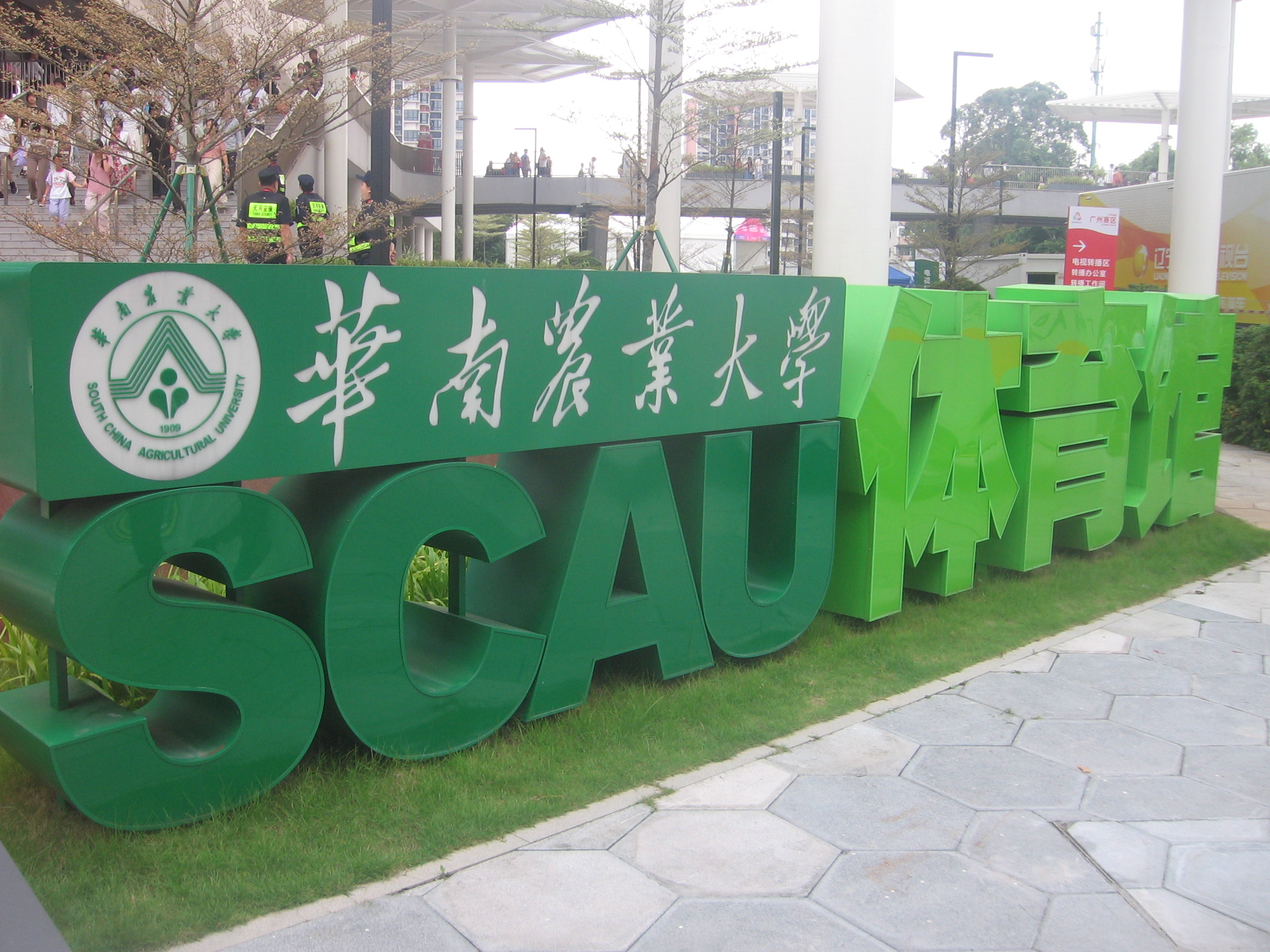
Gymnasium, built for 2025 National Games of China

== History ==
- 1909 - Guangdong province's agricultural experiment station and Affiliated Institute of Agriculture was founded.
- 1917 - Guangdong Province Public Agricultural School, and began to set up agricultural major(4-year degree).
- 1924 - Incorporated into Guangdong University, as College of Agriculture.
- 1926 - Rename to College of Agriculture, National Sun Yat-sen University.
- 1931 - Sun Yat-sen University prepared to build a new campus in Shipai, and totally received about 3.5 square kilometers of land in the north of Shipai, The College of Agricultural college starts to develop rapidly.
- 1952 - The nationwide readjustments of university and college resources took place in 1952. And the South China Agricultural College (华南农学院) was established, through a reorganization process that unified the agricultural schools and departments of universities from 2 provinces in Southern China, including the former National Sun Yat-sen University, Lingnan University, Guangxi University.
- 1979 - It was selected as one of National Key Universities.
- 1984 - The university was renamed as South China Agricultural University in 1984.
- 2000 - The university was transferred under the administration of Guangdong Province in 2000 during the reform of the management system of higher learning institutions.
- 2015 - Selected as a Cultivated High-level University of Guangdong Province.
- 2022 - Became one of the Double First-Class Universities in Double First-Class Construction.

== Academics ==
South China Agricultural University has 26 colleges (departments), offering 95 undergraduate programs, 107 master's degree programs, and 60 Ph.D. degree programs. SCAU also offers nine professional master's degrees and a professional doctorate in Veterinary Medicine.

=== Colleges and schools ===
- College of Agriculture
- College of Forestry and Landscape Architecture
- College of Horticulture
- College of Veterinary Medicine
- College of Animal Science
- College of Marine Sciences
- College of Natural Resources and Environment
- College of Life Science
- College of Food Science
- College of Engineering
- College of Water Conservancy and Civil Engineering
- College of Materials and Energy
- College of Mathematics and Informatics
- College of Software Engineering
- College of Electronic Engineering
- College of Artificial Intelligence
- College of Economics and Management
- College of Public Management
- College of Humanities and Law
- College of Foreign Studies
- College of Arts
- College of Marxist Philosophy
- College of Continuing Education
- College of International Education
- Department of Physical Education
- Institute of Innovation and Entrepreneurship
- Zhujiang College
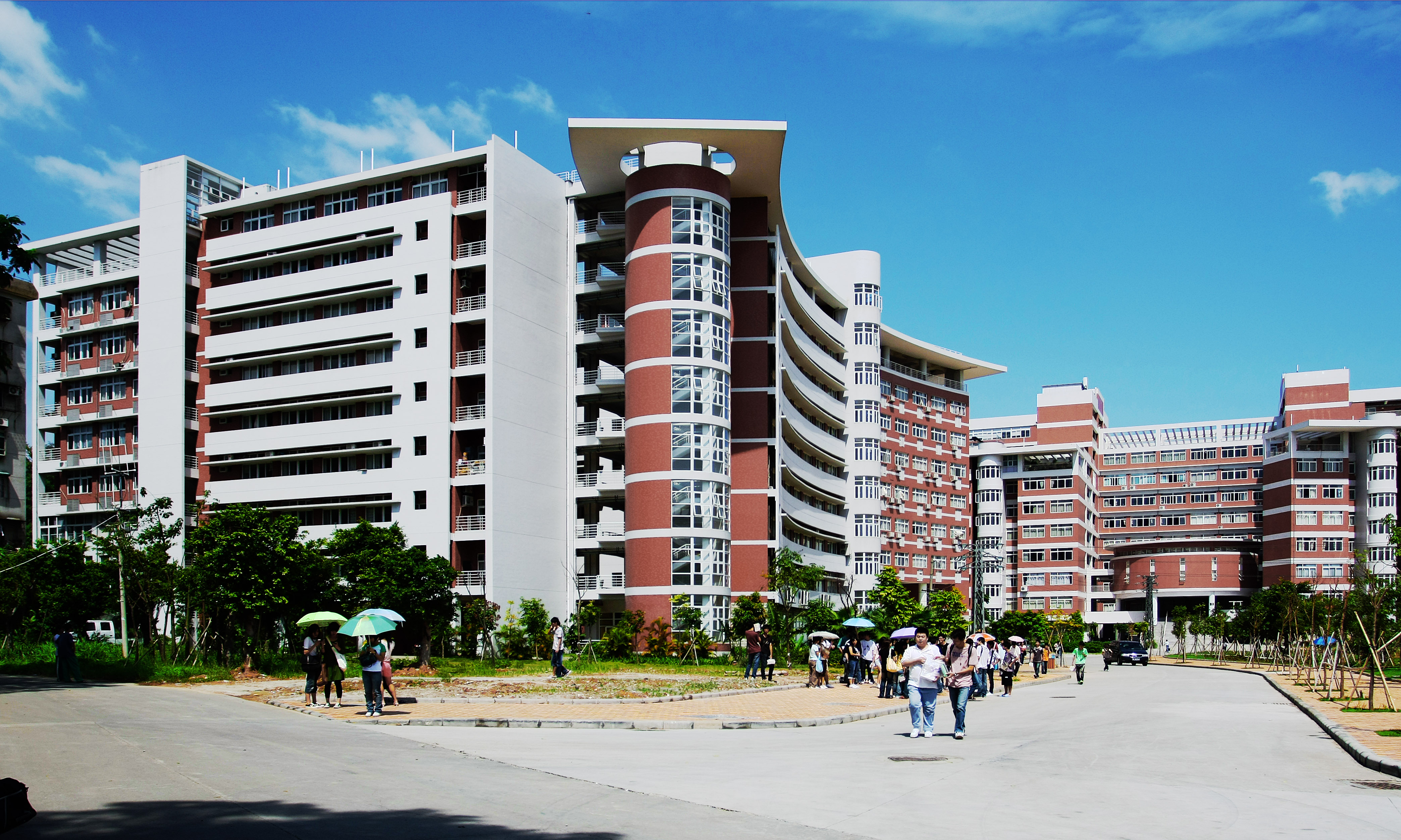
College of Agriculture

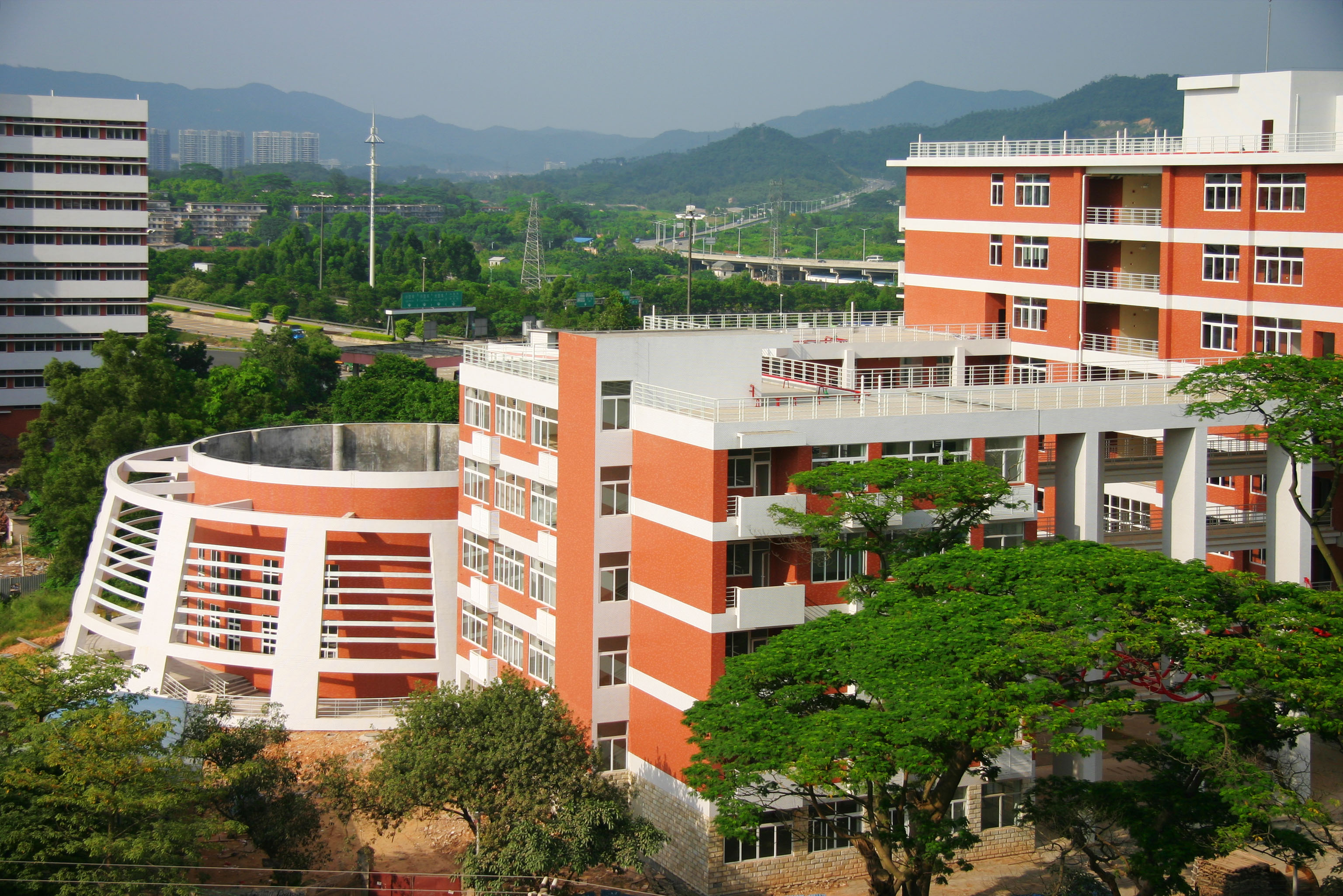
College of Forestry and Landscape Architecture

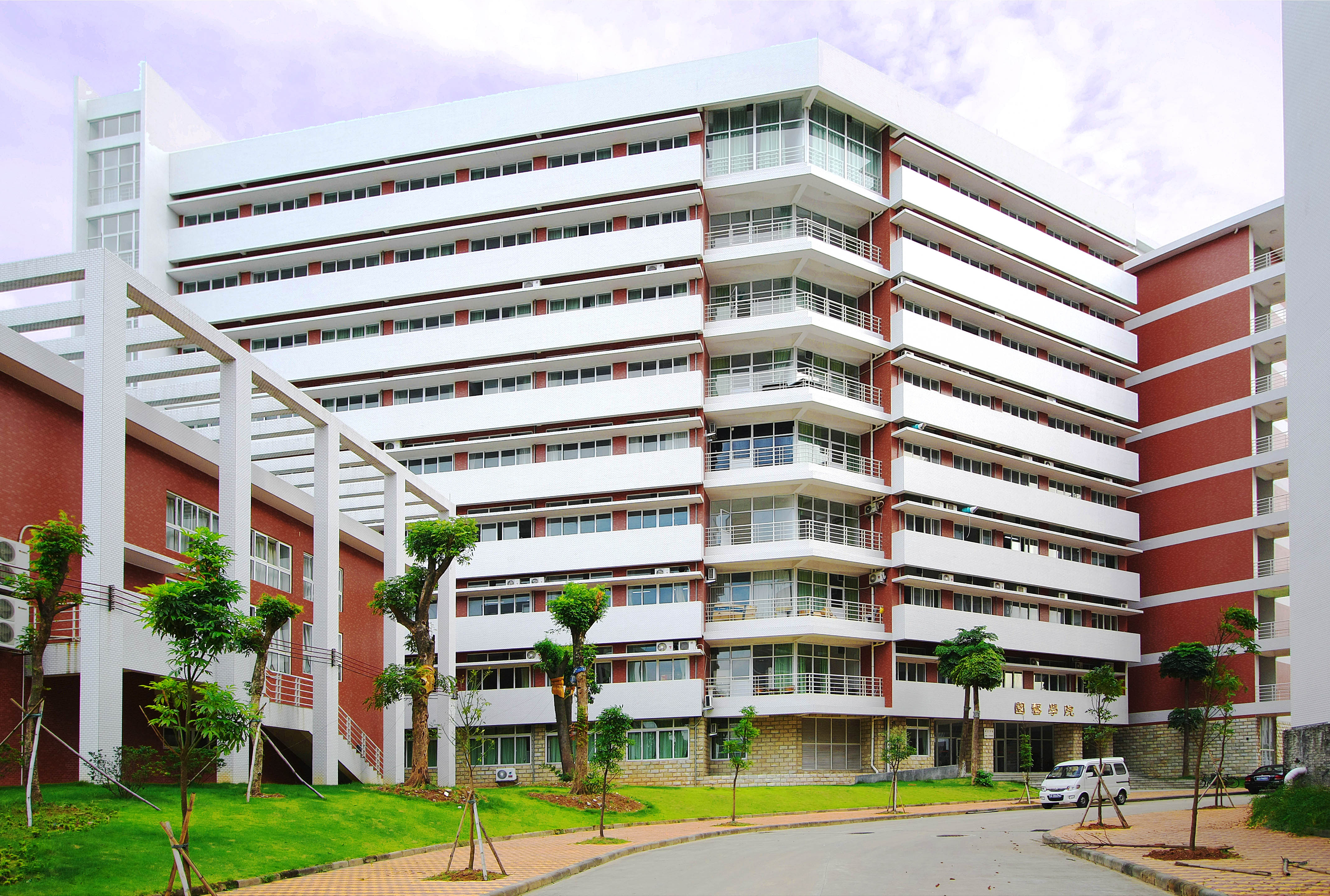
College of Horticulture

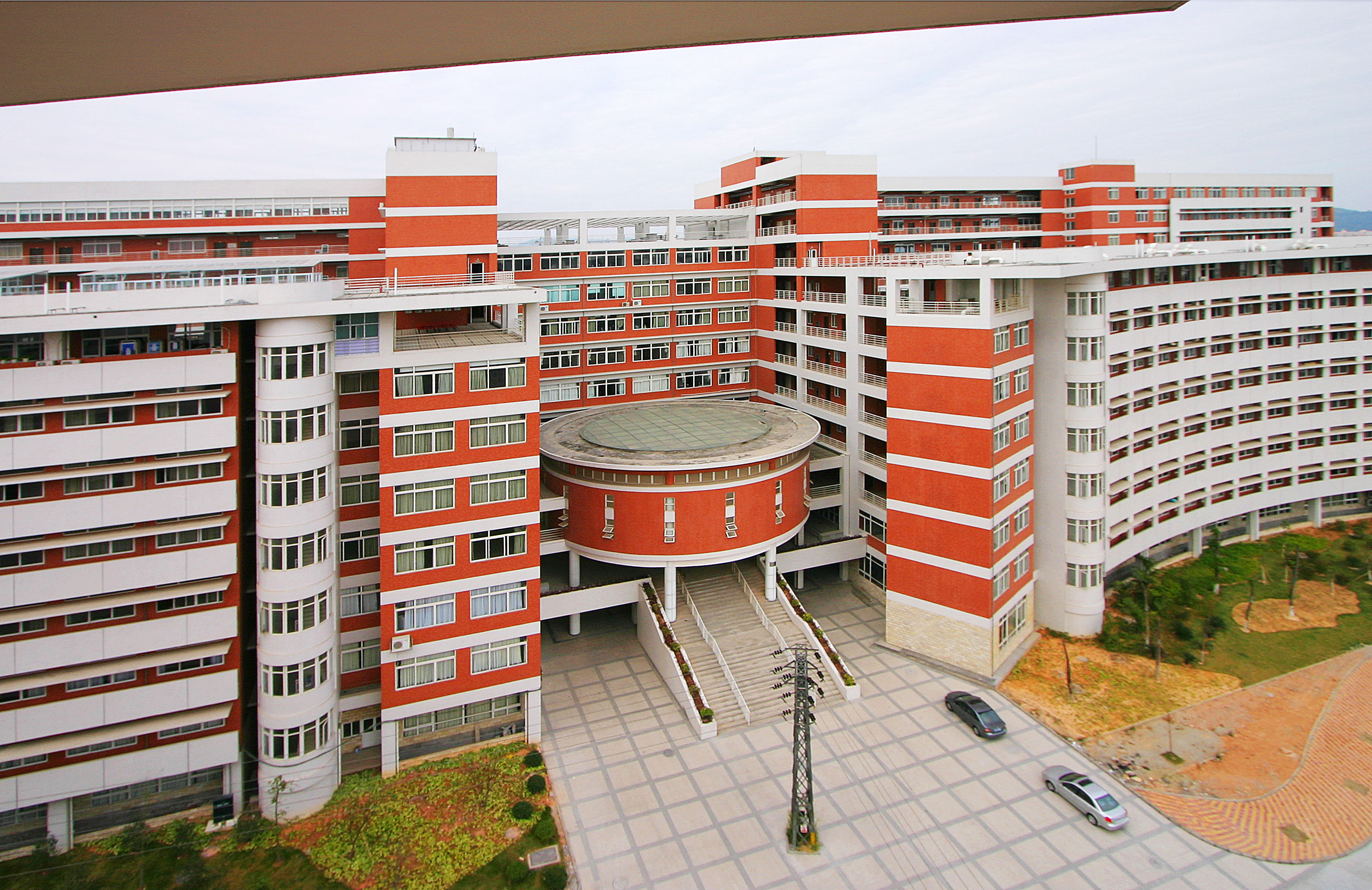
College of Natural Resources and Environment

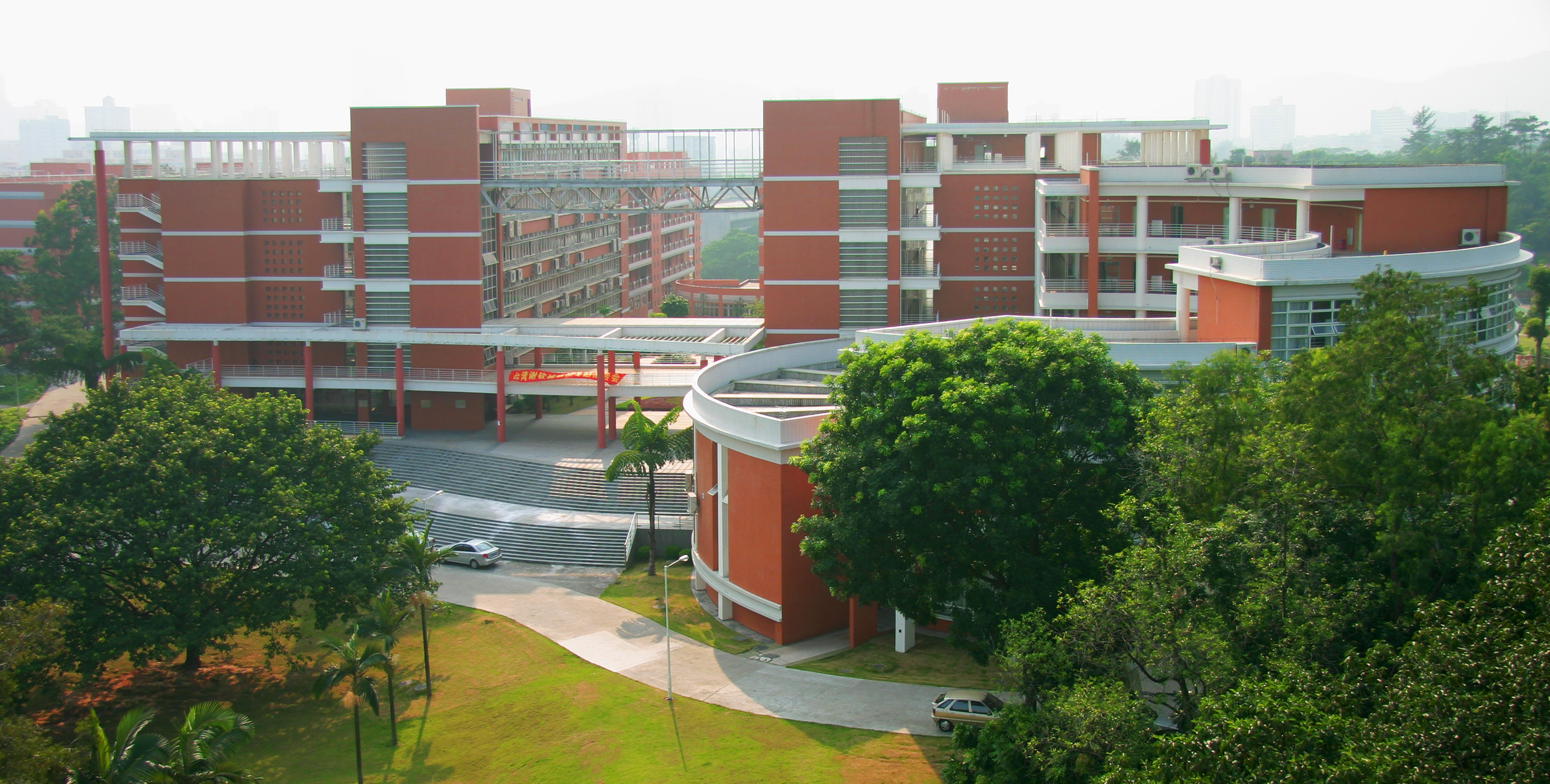
College of Engineering

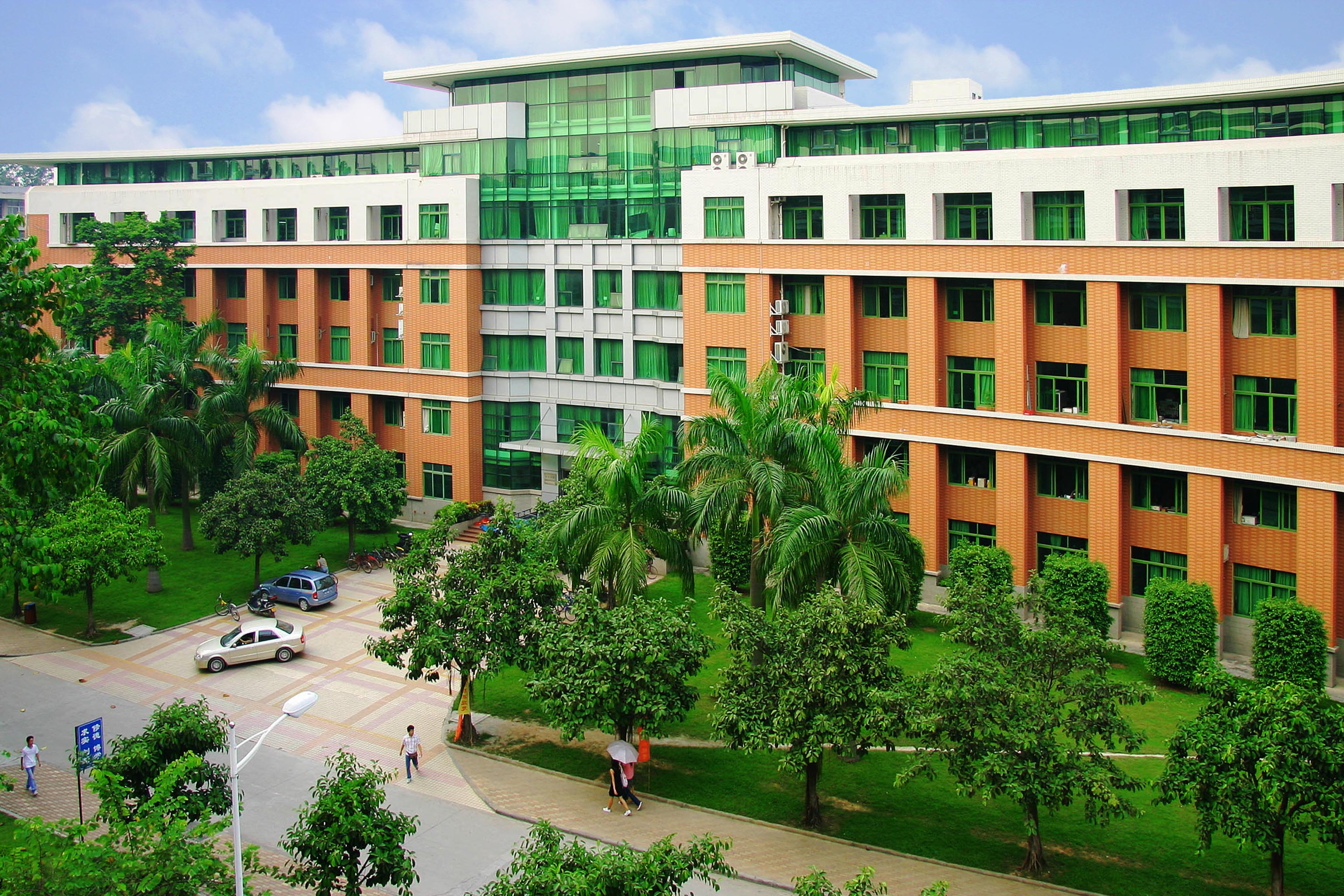
College of Food Science

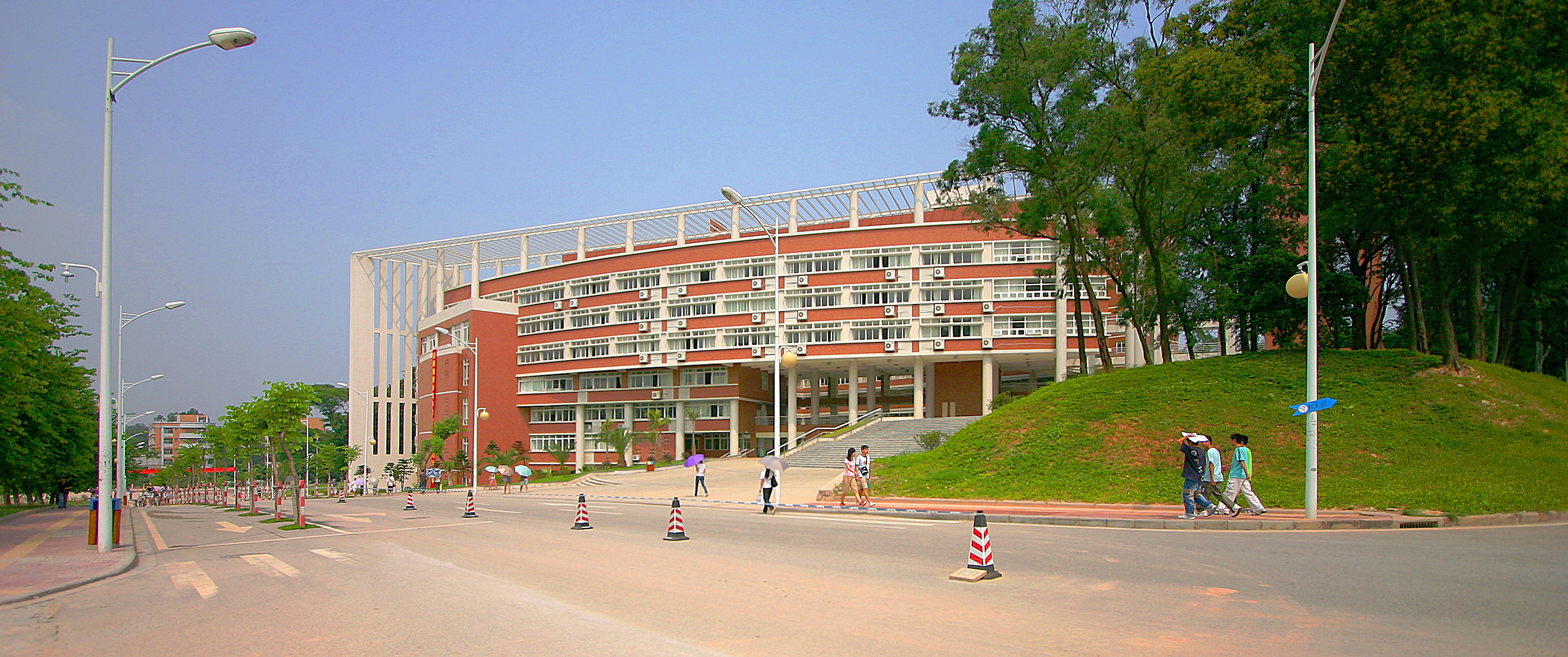
College of Economics and Management

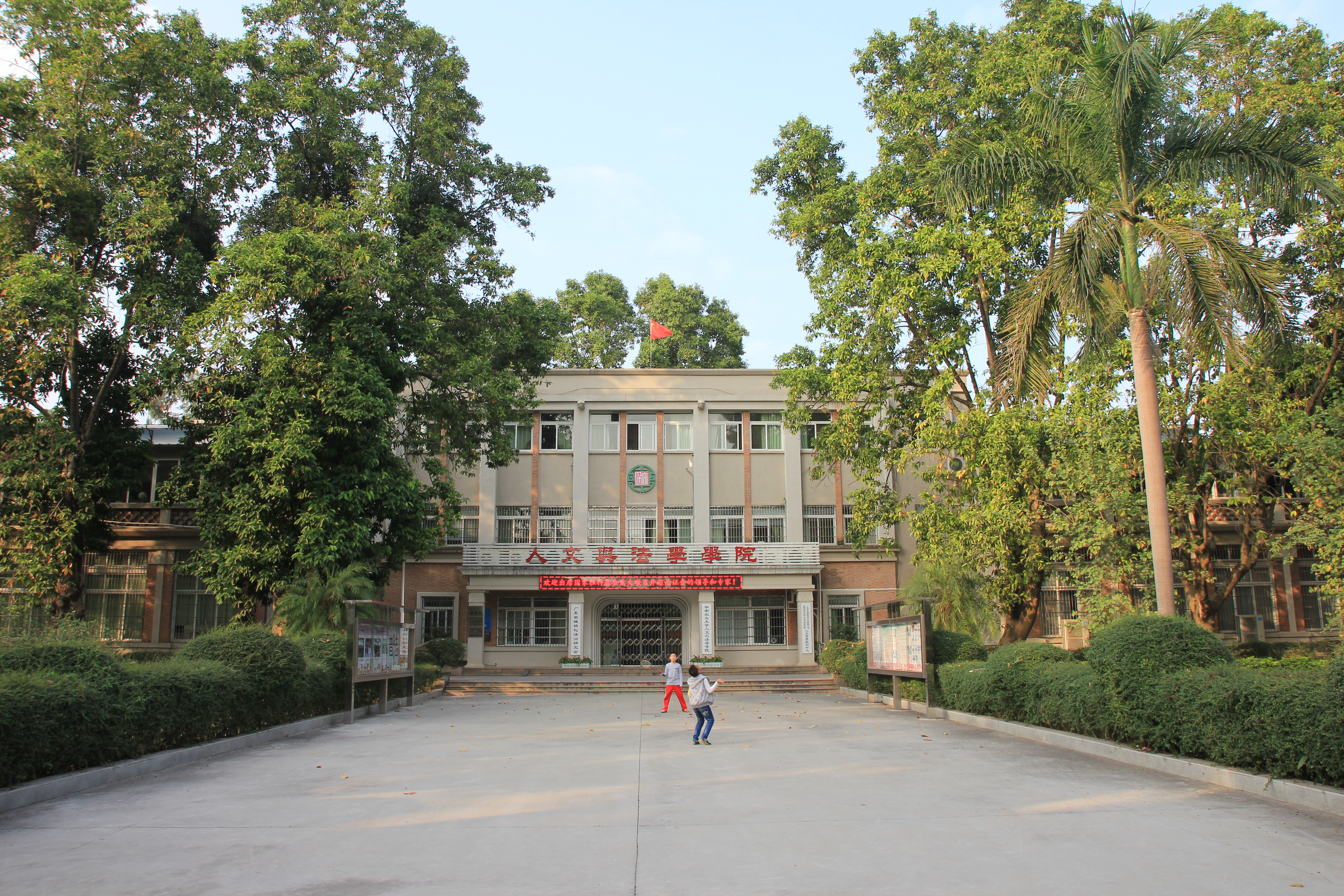
College of Humanities and Law

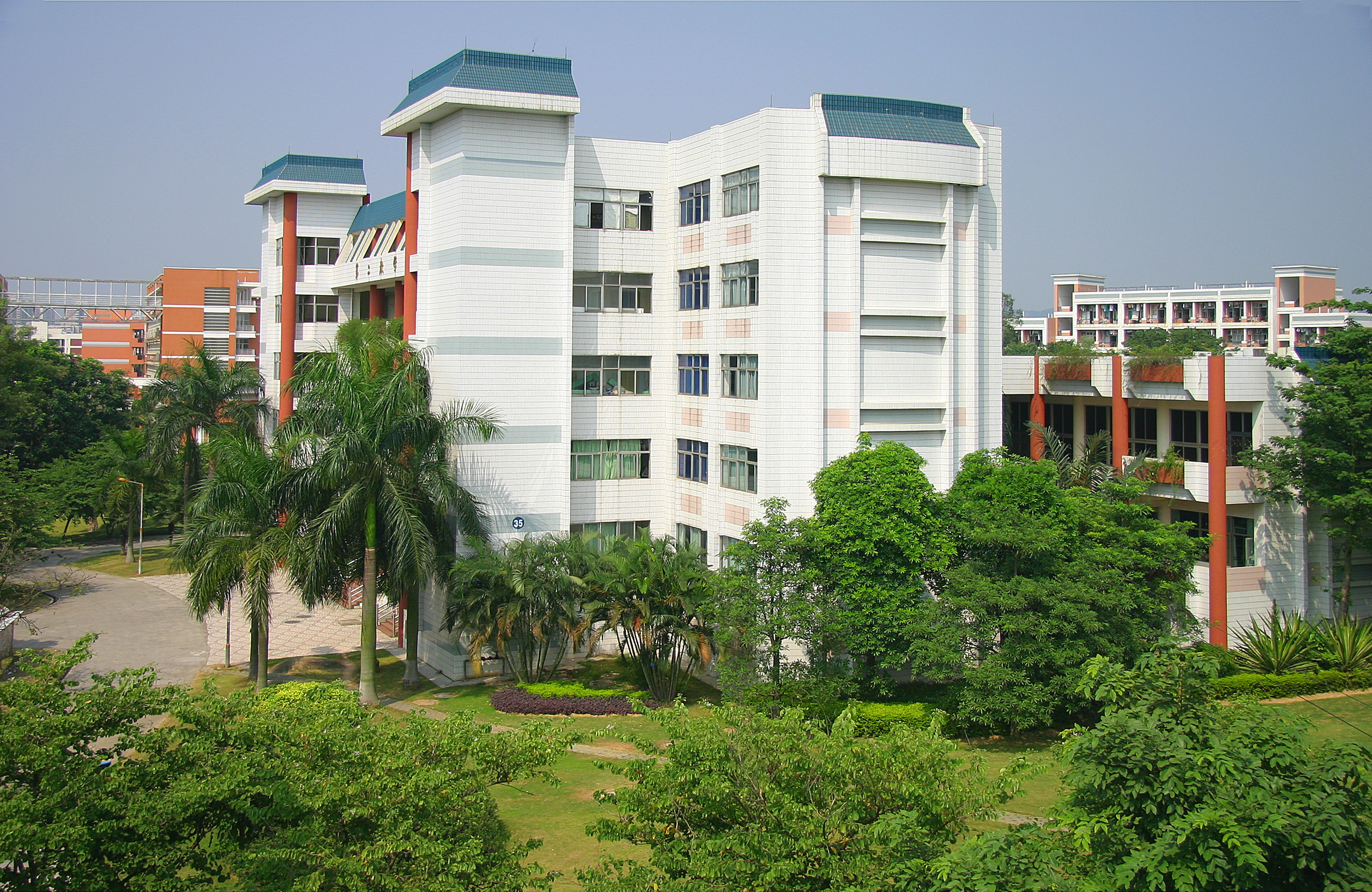
College of Water Conservancy and Civil Engineering

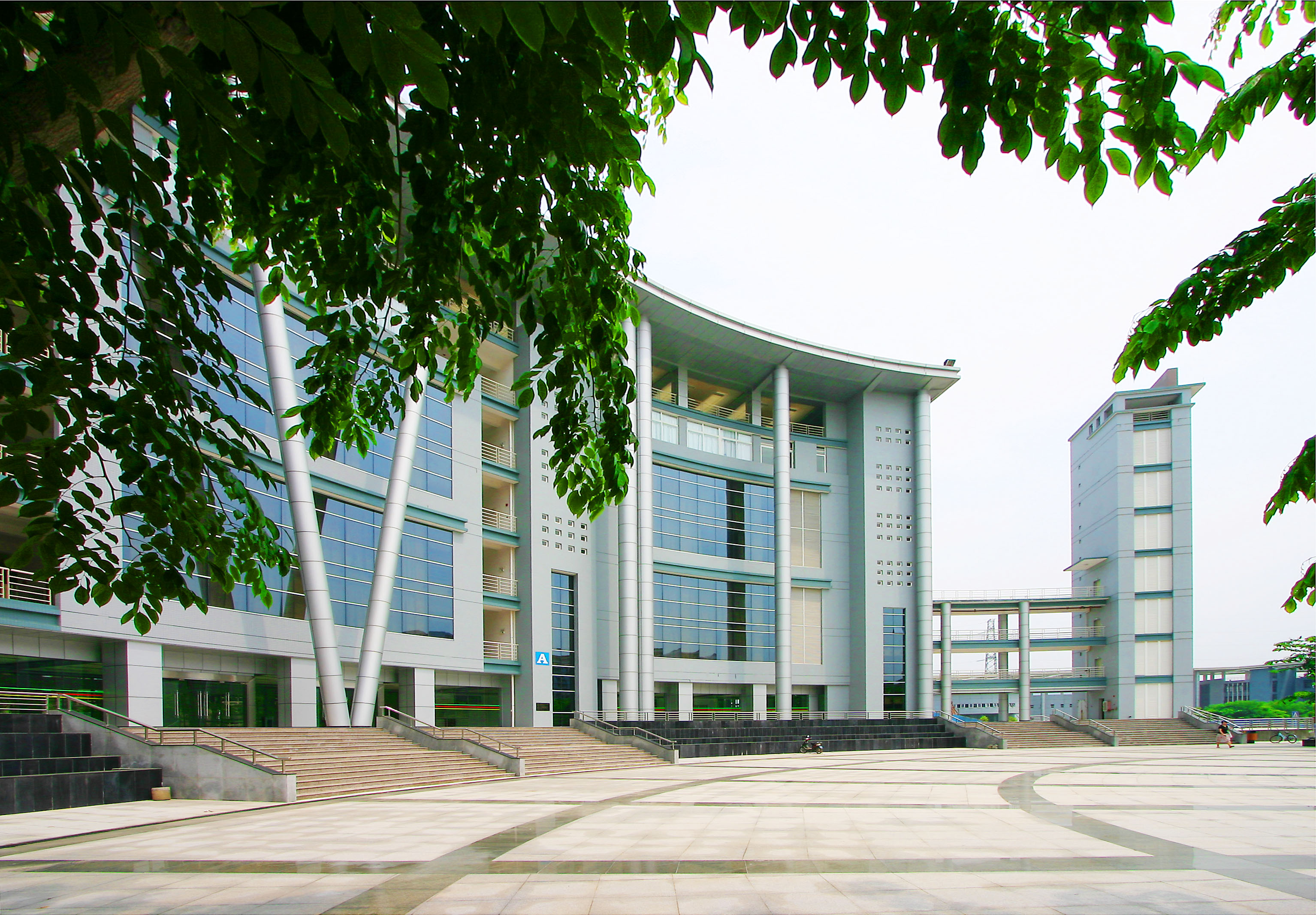
College of Foreign Studies

University ranking
2023 U.S. News & World Report Best Universities Ranking	#
Global	702
2023 ARWU Academic Ranking of World Univisities	#
Global	401-500
2024 CWUR World Universities Ranking	#
Global	608

Subject rankings
2020 QS Subject Rankings	#
Agriculture & Forestry	30
2018 U.S. News & World Report Subject Rankings	#
Agricultural Sciences	160
Plant and Animal Science	253

=== Rankings ===
- The individual subject ranking of South China Agricultural University was 50th-100th in Agriculture & Forestry according to the QS World University Rankings for 2016.
- The university ranked 962th according to the US News Best Global Universities 2017. In particular, its Agricultural Sciences was ranked 177th, and its Plant and Animal Science was ranked 228th.
