= Impact of the COVID-19 pandemic on the telehealth industry =

Impact of coronavirus on telehealth

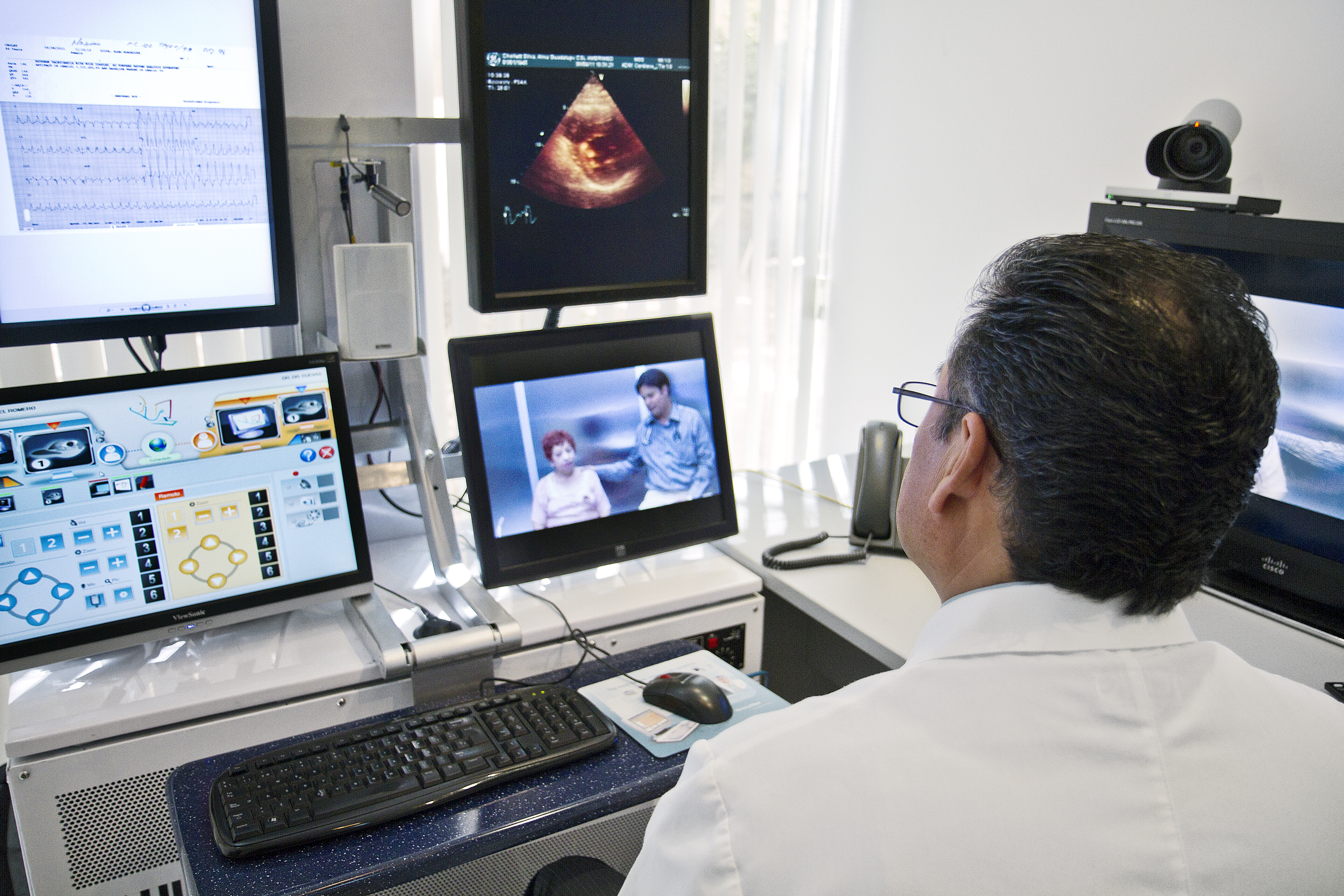
Consultation by a doctor through telehealth

Before the COVID-19 pandemic, telehealth adoption was gradually increasing. With the outbreak of COVID-19 in early 2020, healthcare professionals reduced in-person visits to minimize exposure. This led to an increase in the use of telemedicine with a concomitant increase in publications. Telehealth has since remained widely utilized in healthcare services.

== Growth in the industry ==
Telehealth companies have witnessed substantial growth in their business operations since the onset of the pandemic, evident in the significant rise in both patient volume and financial prosperity. For instance, within a short span between February and March 2020, telehealth claims at the Blue Cross Blue Shield of Massachusetts escalated by an astounding 3,500%. NYU Langone Health's telehealth platform swiftly expanded by integrating over 1,300 new healthcare providers during the pandemic, highlighting the industry's meteoric surge. The COVID-19 outbreak facilitated an unprecedented reach for telehealth companies.

The influx of new clientele has propelled companies such as Teladoc, which had capitalized on this market. Evidently, Teladoc's stock valuation in 2020 increased year to date by 139%, while the industry's second-largest company, Amwell, went public on September 17, 2020. Collectively, the top 60 virtual health companies experienced a substantial increase in total revenue, increasing from $3 billion in 2019–2020 to $5.5 billion in 2020–2021. This growth had attracted interest from venture capitalists and other investors seeking to partake in the telehealth industry's expansion during the pandemic. Venture capital funding for telehealth companies in the initial quarter of 2020 rose to $788 million, a figure more than threefold compared to the funds raised in the corresponding period of 2019. Additionally, telehealth startups experienced a year-over-year increase of 1,818% in funding during 2020.

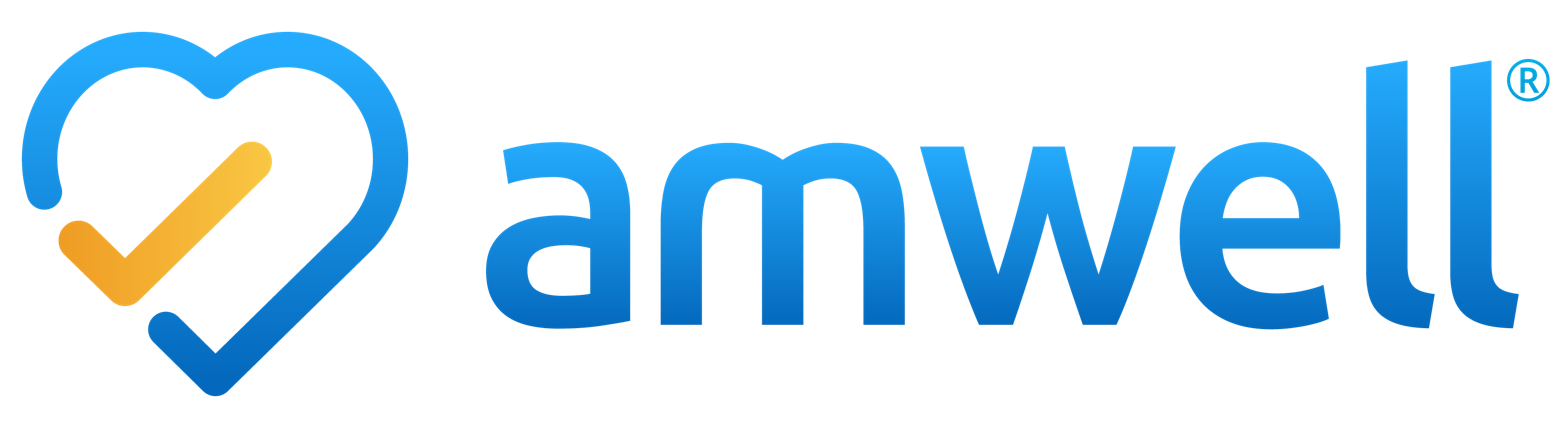
Logo of the second largest telehealth firm, Amwell

== Growth in usage rate ==
In 2020, over 50% of all outpatient care was being delivered completely virtually at its peak during the pandemic. The number of patients using telehealth has grown from 11% in 2019 to around 46% in 2021. Analysts believe that this growth will be somewhat sustained due to the pandemic allowing telehealth to overcome its biggest obstacle, which was its lack of awareness among patients and providers. Millions of patients and providers have now used telehealth to fulfill part of their healthcare needs, and some evidence suggests telehealth contributes to similar outcomes and patient satisfaction. Not only has telehealth become known among the public, but providers have also had extremely positive interactions with these services. 57% of providers view telehealth more favorably than before the pandemic and 64% of providers are more comfortable with using telehealth platforms. Patients from various demographic locations have given positive reviews on telehealth services due to which telehealth/ telemedicine appears to paint a bright future for the industry.

There was an increase in the use of telemedicine with a concomitant increase in publications.

== Potential barriers to growth ==
=== Lower usage rate ===
The weekly average of daily telehealth visits has been declining since April 2020. In April, the visits were peaking at around two thousand per week and they have dropped to around five hundred a week in June 2020. Experts believe that the high peaks of telehealth usage during the pandemic will come down even more and that it is unrealistic to believe that this peak in usage will become the new norm.

=== Cross-state practice ===
Most states require that the healthcare professional using telehealth have a form of license to practice in that state, regardless of whether they are located in the state. Cross-state practice issues can inhibit the growth of the telehealth market due to it affecting the staff composition at these companies. These companies will have to make sure that they have professionals that are licensed in the states that the patients are from in order to service the patients.

=== Coverage and reimbursement issues ===
Medicare, Medicaid, and commercial payers all have a unique set of rules and criteria for coverage and reimbursements for telehealth services. Lawyers believe that these rules and criteria can be inconsistent at times and can be not fully comprehensive. These unique rules and inconsistencies could potentially add another layer of complexity for providers to have to go through in order to get paid for their services.

=== IT and security issues ===
Experts believe that telehealth services hinge upon the success of their IT services. These services include software security, software compliance, and data interoperability. Constructing and maintaining these IT services can be expensive and can be hard to fund due to competition. With the growing number of potential patients, these startup companies could require funding to expand their IT services. Without this expansion, these companies could have lower service quality and put at risk the data and privacy of their consumers.

Another IT-related issue involves technicality, where patients or caregivers have problems accessing telehealth services due to various technical challenges. During the COVID-19 pandemic, one study found that 36% of cancellations or rescheduling of appointments was due to technical challenges before or during the appointment.

=== Provider-patient relationships ===
States require that patients and healthcare professionals to establish a relationship. This relationship was normally established when the patient met the provider in-person. This requirement has evolved in some states to focus more on the existence of several factors such as the patient's medical history or the provider's affirmative acts.

=== Requirements for in-person examinations ===
A major limitation to telemedicine is the absence of in-person examinations. Complaints requiring urgent assessments will require immediate office visits. Postponements, however, may safely be delayed in most circumstances.

=== Remote prescribing ===
Some states require that an in-person examination happen before allowing for the remote prescribing of drugs. Other states allow remote prescribing without an in-person visit, however there needs to be an interaction via a face-to-face video call. All states do not allow for remote prescribing of drugs if the patient only submitted an online questionnaire.

=== Telemental health ===
Due to lockdowns or 'stay at home' orders, at the start of the COVID-19 pandemic, mental health services in high-income countries were able to adapt existing service provision to telemental health care. Estimates suggest that between 48% and 100% of service users who were already receiving care at the start of the pandemic were able to continue their mental health care using remote methods. Some face-to-face appointments still took place if necessary.

During the pandemic telemental health care (mostly phone and video calls) was effective and viewed as acceptable by the majority of clinicians and service users for use in an emergency situation. However both groups had concerns regarding the longer term use of telemental health care. For example, clinicians identified concerns including difficulties with medication appointments, concerns around engaging and assessing new patients, and finding it harder to assess some physical indicators of mental health status remotely. Service users identified barriers including a lack of private space at home to access during their sessions or access to technology.

The rates of telemental health use seem to have declined as COVID-19 restrictions were loosened, indicating that face-to-face care might be preferable for some service users and clinicians.

== Future opportunities ==
=== Lower cost to patients and healthcare facilities ===
Telehealth often results in significantly lower costs and time commitments than traditional in-person meetings. At the University of Michigan, a study found that on average patients travel a total of 110 miles to attend a clinic visit. Many patients are forced to make a day out of this large time commitment and are forced to take time off work and incur child care costs. By using telehealth, patients can meet with their doctors from anywhere without the need to take time off of work. Telehealth can provide cost savings to hospitals and healthcare offices. Since some portion of patients would be meeting online with their doctors, the need for large waiting rooms would be reduced. This will allow healthcare facilities to be smaller which will result in cost savings due to less overhead being spent on rooms and facilities for patients that do not need to be seen in person.

=== Substance abuse treatment ===
In July 2021, telehealth made up 30% of substance abuse treatment. Experts believe that there could be substantial growth potential in substance abuse treatment for the telehealth industry. Telehealth is convenient for patients and makes it easy for them to get the help that they need. Telehealth has also been linked to higher treatment retention. Studies have found that when telehealth video conferencing was incorporated into outpatient treatment programs, 88% of the patients kept their appointments as compared to only 77% that had solely in-person appointments. Due to these benefits there is a potential for telehealth to increase their market share of the substance abuse segment of healthcare.

=== Tele rheumatology ===
In February 2021, 17% of outpatient and office visit claims relating to rheumatology were done through telehealth. Clinicians believe that telehealth could play a role in the treatment of rheumatoid arthritis and other symptoms associated with arthritis. Even though clinicians believe that telehealth does not improve diagnosing rheumatologic conditions, they believe that telehealth can help with managing the pain of rheumatoid arthritis. Clinicians consider gout, rheumatoid arthritis, fibromyalgia, and osteoarthritis as the most appropriate to manage using telehealth. Although clinicians believe that the use of tele rheumatology is dependent on the phase of care, they believe that it is vital to increasing the access of care for patients with arthritis.

=== Present/future usage rate ===
As of July 2021, telehealth usage has stabilized at a level 38 times higher than before the pandemic. Telehealth usage rate across all specialties has stabilized to around 13% to 17%. While the usage rate has gone down since its peak during the pandemic, experts believe that telehealth will still play a major role in healthcare. Experts predict that at least 20-30% of all healthcare will be provided through telehealth in 2021 and beyond.

=== Future market size ===
Analysts are predicting a high amount of growth in the telehealth industry in the United States and globally. In the United States, there are predictions that around $250 billion of Medicare, Medicaid, and Commercial OP could become virtualized, which would represent 20% of the total market share. Research analysts believe that the global market size of the telehealth industry will grow from $62.45 billion in 2020 to over $475.50 billion by 2026.
