= Lifeline Foundation =

- Founded: 1996
- Location: Kolkata, India
- Region served: Nationwide
- Method: Telephone counseling, E-mail counseling
- Key people: Suksham Singh (Director)
- Website: www.lifelinefoundation.in

Lifeline Foundation is an NGO based in Kolkata, India. It provides telephone counselling to mentally distressed individuals. It was founded in 1996 and has been noted for its efforts by the international media.

== Services offered ==
Lifeline Foundation operates a telephone helpline to provide counselling to suicidal or other emotionally distressed individuals. The helpline is staffed by volunteers and receives 20-25 calls a day. It also engages in raising awareness about mental health issues such as anxiety, depression, exam-stress and other issues in and around Kolkata by hosting seminars and workshops.
