= Cyberpsychology =

Field of research

Cyberpsychology (also known as Internet psychology, web psychology, or digital psychology) is a scientific inter-disciplinary domain that focuses on the psychological phenomena which emerge as a result of the human interaction with digital technology, particularly the Internet. Cyberpsychology is a field that explores the psychological phenomena associated with cyberspace which includes study of human behaviour, emotions in online environments like social media, virtual reality and many more gaming platforms. Cyberpsychology also interacts with the areas like neuroscience, sociology and media studies that offers insights into how digital tools shape individual and collective experiences.

== Overview ==
Cyberpsychology is a broadly used term for inter-disciplinary research that commonly describes how humans interact with others over technology, how human behavior and psychological states are affected by technology, and how technology can be optimally developed for human needs. While not explicitly defined as cyberpsychology, previous research into the impacts of virtual reality on human behavior has been identified by cyberpsychologists and leveraged to guide the parameters of research areas. The importance of cyberpsychology as an independent and defined field from existing studies has been proposed by researchers such as Bruno Emond and Robert L West, suggesting the field should include cognitive modeling.

While cyberpsychology remains broad, recent research has commonly been emerging on social media's impact on personality disorders, computer addiction, video game addiction, and online anxiety. The effects of virtual therapy have also been identified due to the global COVID-19 pandemic. These research areas also include the positive impact on the human psychological state regarding interaction with social artificial intelligence. Research areas also include the influence of cyberpsychology on other fields; in research by Scott M. Debb, cyberpsychology is discussed as having interdependency with the discipline of Cybersecurity, specifically regarding human subjects.

== Professional bodies ==
The British Psychological Society has a dedicated Cyberpsychology Section which was founded in 2018. Likewise the American Psychological Association has a dedicated division for Media Psychology & Technology. First published in 2007, Masaryk University in the Czech Republic has published Cyberpsychology: Journal of Psychosocial Research on Cyberspace, an open access, web-based, peer-reviewed scholarly journal that focused on social science research about cyberspace.

== Cyberpsychological behaviors ==
It was around the turn of the millennium that the United States broke the 50 percent mark in Internet use, personal computer use, and cell phone use. The relevance of human–computer interaction (HCI) research within the field of cyberpsychology may become more visible and necessary in understanding the current modern lifestyles of many people.

=== Social media ===
Facebook, the leading online social media platform globally, affects users' psychological status in multiple ways. Facebook follows the one-to-many communication pattern, allowing users to share information about their lives, including social activities and photographs. This feature was enhanced in 2012, when Facebook Messenger was implemented to allow users more one-on-one communication merging with the Facebook Chat feature. Facebook users enjoy the sense of being connected. From a social standpoint, the internet is a breeding ground for creating a space for relationships, roles, and a new sense of self. Further, Facebook can be a tool in strengthening and reaffirming a relationship, as it allows for positive expressions of trust, affection, and commitment. People can derive a sense of social connectedness and belongingness in the online environment. Messaging can also be used to express trust, affection, and commitment, thus strengthening personal relationships. This online social connectedness was associated with lower levels of depression and anxiety, and greater levels of subjective well-being.

The size of an individual's online social network is closely linked to brain structure associated with social cognition. Because of the access people have had to internet technologies, some behaviors can be characterized as information foraging. Information foraging is the theory that when users have a certain information goal, they assess the information that they can extract from any candidate source of information relative to the cost involved in extracting that information and choose one or several candidate sources so that they maximize the ratio.

However, there are also downsides. A high level of Facebook usage is associated with adverse relationship outcomes (such as divorce and breaking up) and that these negative outcomes are mediated by conflict about high levels of Facebook use. To cope with the uncertainty of a suspected romantic relationship, partner surveillance on Facebook is becoming more popular. However, this was only true for those who are or have been, in relatively newer relationships of three years or less. Excessive social media usage also increases feelings of social isolation, as virtual relationships replace authentic social interactions. Additionally, one study found that social rejection or ostracism in an immersive virtual environment has a negative impact on affect (emotion), in the same way, that ostracism negatively impacts emotions in real life contexts. These findings do not demonstrate causality: relationship maintenance behaviors, such as surveillance and monitoring, are indicators of current levels of trust within the relationship. This suggests that certain behaviors on social media may be predicting negative outcomes, rather than causing them. When it comes to technology, a lot of people do not know when something has gone wrong until it goes wrong.

Another byproduct of social media use is the "fear of missing out", or FOMO. This fear develops from a user's repetitive and obsessive status-checking of "friend" status updates and posts related to social events or celebrations resulting in a feeling of being "left out" if these events are not experienced. There is also the closely related fear of being missed (FOBM), or the fear of invisibility. This fear involves an obsessive need to provide constant status updates on one's own personal, day-to-day life, movements, travel, events, etc. unable to "un-plug". Evidence suggests this type of anxiety is a mediating factor in increased social media use and decreased self-esteem. Users see only the joyous or entertaining experiences in a friend's life and compares them to their own lesser experiences. Underestimating peers negative experiences correlates with greater loneliness and lower overall life satisfaction. Inviting constant comparisons inevitably lowers self-esteem and feelings of self-worth; hence, Facebook and other social media accounts appear to exploit a vulnerability in human nature.

Short videos and memes are another aspect often seen in social media. Platforms like TikTok have been shown to negatively affect young college-aged adults with mental disorders as a result of their frequent usage as shown by one Chinese study which found negative cognition tendencies resulting in negative emotions. There is a murder inspired from a movie Halloween which was later uploaded in TikTok by a murderer. While getting arrested, she also mentioned, How she Michael Myers her big sister. Other researchers have also explored the manifestation of factitious disorder and dissociative identity disorder among recurrent users of social media platforms like TikTok. Memes, created images meant to inspire humor, have been shown to help people to interact successfully with other people online and to build a shared positive experience and allowing a glimpse into the formation of culture and language.

=== Video games ===
Online gaming is a form of social activity that has been positively correlated with improving depressive symptoms in young individuals who otherwise lack a supportive social group. For adults, video games have been shown to improve cognitive abilities as well as reducing several mental illness symptoms.

There has been controversy on the subject of violence in video games. Some studies have found that violent video games can lead to negative behavioral outcomes such as decreased empathy and an increase of aggressive behavior. Video games being a primary source of entertainment, there are a few incidents inspired by video games that have led to crimes in real life. Others have found little to no correlation with these behaviors being linked to violent video games. Overall, despite over 30 years of research, there is no definitive evidence of a connection with these behaviors and video games.

Addiction has also been tied to gaming and is an area that is considered to be valuable for future study. The World Health Organization currently recognizes Gaming Disorder as a mental health condition. Conditions of this disorder largely refer to an increasing lack of interest in other activities and signs of addictive behavior leading to more game usage. However, there are those who believe that there is a difference between those that show these conditions but experience a positive impact and those that experience more negative outcomes and further research is needing to be done in order to definitely prove the positive or negative outcomes that gaming can lead to. For instance, some studies have suggested that gaming is a result of negative health conditions, not the root cause of them.

=== Psychotherapy in cyberspace ===
Psychotherapy in cyberspace is also known as cybertherapy or e-therapy. The first instance of this practice did not include interaction with a human, but rather a program called ELIZA, which was designed by Joseph Weizenbaum to answer questions and concerns with basic Rogerian responses. ELIZA proved to be so convincing that many people either mistook the program for human, or became emotionally attached to it.

In online counseling, a person e-mails or chats online with a therapist. There are also new applications of technology within psychology and healthcare which utilize augmented and virtual reality components—for example in pain management treatment, PTSD treatment, use of avatars in virtual environments, and self- and clinician-guided computerized cognitive behavior therapies. The voluminous work of Azy Barak (University of Haifa) and a growing number of researchers in the US and UK gives strong evidence to the efficacy (and sometimes superiority) of Internet-facilitated, computer-assisted treatments relative to 'traditional' in-office-only approaches. The UK's National Health Service now recognizes CCBT (computerized cognitive behavioral therapy) as the preferred method of treatment for mild-to-moderate presentations of anxiety and depression.

== Impacts on mental health ==
=== ADHD ===
An emerging body of research suggests that internet addiction and excessive social media usage or gaming activity may be more prevalent in ADHD individuals due to people diagnosed with ADHD being more likely to struggling with organizing or managing time. Male college students are more likely than women college students to be screened positively for adult ADHD; however, the overall association between Internet addiction and attention deficit is more significant in females. In the view of Dr. Robert Melillo, founder of the Brain Balance Program, "When kids play computer games, their minds are processing information in a much different way than kids who are, say, running around on a playground... Recent studies have shown that playing computer games only builds very short-term attention that needs to be rewarded frequently."

=== Mental illness ===
Studies have shown that social media, and Facebook in particular, can be a factor in depression, especially among teenage users. Social psychologist Ethan Kross led a study that investigated how a person's mood fluctuated during time spent on Facebook and whether or not they modified their Facebook usage. Results suggest that as participants spent more time on Facebook, their feelings of well-being decreased and feelings of depression increased. Another study found that participants in the highest quartile for social media site visits per week were at an increased likelihood of experiencing depression.

Addiction has also been tied to online usage. This may be because people are learning to access and process information more rapidly and to shift attention quickly from one task to the next. All this access and vast selection is causing some entertainment seekers to develop the constant need for instant gratification with a loss of patience. Results from a survey of university undergraduates showed that almost 10% met criteria for what investigators describe as "disordered social networking use". Respondents who met criteria for "Facebook addiction" also reported statistically significant symptoms similar to the symptoms of addiction, such as tolerance (increased Facebook use over time), withdrawal (irritability when unable to access Facebook), and cravings to access the site. "Our findings suggest that there may be shared mechanisms underlying both substance and behavioral addictions," Hormes added. The prevalence of internet addiction varies considerably between countries and is inversely related to the quality of life. Many countries in Asia (particularly China, South Korea, and Japan) have raised public concern over the recent rise in internet addictions.

=== Behavioral impacts ===
Social media at use can lead to lower quality sleep. A study commissioned by Travelodge hotels concluded that Britain has become a nation of 'Online-A-Holics'. The study found Britons spend 16 minutes in bed socially networking with pals each night – the peak chatting time being 9:45 pm and are getting just six hours and 21 minutes of sleep per night.

Other studies have found a correlation between social media use and disordered eating. In women college students, social media use predicts disordered-eating symptomatology and other related variables (such as the drive for thinness and body dissatisfaction). For men, media use predicted endorsement of personal thinness and dieting.

== In popular culture ==
- Lisa Kudrow's Web-based situation comedy Web Therapy, in which Kudrow's unaccredited and unscrupulous character Fiona Wallice conducts therapy sessions using iChat, explores many of the ethical and practical issues raised by the prospect of psychotherapy conducted via Internet video chat.
- Patricia Arquette recurs as FBI Special Agent in Charge Avery Ryan, a cyberpsychologist, in CSI: Crime Scene Investigation. She also headlines the spinoff series CSI: Cyber in the same role.
- Forensic anthropologist Dr. Temperance Brennan and Special Agent Seeley Booth in Fox Network's hit television series, Bones, practice cyberpsychology by collecting information from suspects' social media accounts to analyze personality, communications, and possible motives to help apprehend the criminal.

== See also ==
- Computational psychology – Study of the computational basis of learning and inference
- Deprogramming – Coercive intervention against a person's beliefs
- Online disinhibition effect – Lack of restraint in online interactions
- Psychological effects of Internet use
- Psychology of programming
- Social media therapy
- Web mining – Process of analyzing large data sets

== Bibliography ==
- The Psychology of Cyberspace by John Suler - July 2005
- Gordo-López, J. & Parker, I. (1999). Cyberpsychology. New York: Routledge. ISBN 9780415924979
- Wallace, P. M. (1998). The Psychology of the Internet. Cambridge: Cambridge University Press. ISBN 9780521797092
- Whittle, D. B. (1997). Cyberspace: The human dimension. New York: W.H. Freeman. ISBN 978-0716783114

== Journals ==
- Journal of Computer Mediated Communication
- Cyberpsychology: Journal of Psychosocial Research on Cyberspace
- Cyberpsychology, Behavior, and Social Networking
- Journal of CyberTherapy & Rehabilitation

== Books ==
- The Cyber Effect: A Pioneering Cyberpsychologist Explains How Human Behavior Changes Online by Mary Aiken, PhD (2016) Spiegel & Grau. ISBN 9780812997859
- Norman, Kent L. (March 2017). Cyberpsychology: An Introduction to Human-Computer Interaction (Print; e-book) (Second ed.). Cambridge; New York, NY: Oxford University Press. doi:10.1017/9781316212554. ISBN 978-1-107-10254-5. LCCN 2016049413. OCLC 982087091. OL 4438684W.
- Cyberpsychology: An Introduction to Human-Computer Interaction by Kent Norman (2008) Cambridge University of Press. ISBN 9780521687027
- The Psychology of Menu Selection: Designing Cognitive Control at the Human/Computer Interface by Kent Norman
- Virtual Reality Therapy for Anxiety Disorders: Advances in Evaluation and Treatment by Brenda K. Wiederhold and Mark D. Wiederhold (2005) American Psychological Association. ISBN 978-1-59147-031-1
- Psychological aspects of cyberspace: Theory, research, applications. by Azy Barak (2008) Cambridge University Press. ISBN 9780521873017
