= Lahad (name) =

Lahad is a name which is used as a surname and a masculine given name. Notable people with the name are as follows:

== Surname ==
- Antoine Lahad (1927–2015), Lebanese Army Major General, and subsequently leader of the South Lebanon Army
- Mooli Lahad (born 1953), Israeli psychologist

== Given name ==
- Lahad Khater (1881–1975), Lebanese historian and writer
