= CSPC =

CSPC may refer to:

- The Center for the Study of the Presidency and Congress, a D.C-based think-tank.
- The Center for Sex Positive Culture in Seattle, Washington
- The David Horowitz Freedom Center, founded in the 1980s by political activist David Horowitz; formerly the Center for the Study of Popular Culture. The center changed its name in July 2006.
- Canadian Standard Product Code (similar to Stock-keeping unit (SKU)).
- Community specialist palliative care
- California State Prison, Corcoran, a prison in the US state of California.
- The International Stress Prevention Center, a NGO in North Israel.
- The Polytechnic State University of Bicol, formerly the Camarines Sur Polytechnic College
- Shijiazhuang Pharma Group
