= Said Hadjerrouit =

Norwegian computer scientist

Said Hadjerrouit is a professor of informatics and mathematics education at the University of Agder in Kristiansand, Norway.

== Education ==
Hadjerrouit received a master's degree in 1985 in software engineering from the Technische Universität Berlin, Germany. In 1992, he received his doctoral degree in engineering in the field of medical expert systems and artificial intelligence.

== Career ==
Hadjerrouit worked as an assistant at the Technische Universität Berlin between 1985 and 1990. His teaching in Berlin focused mostly on informatics and society, philosophical and ethical issues of computing, and computers in developing countries. In 1991, he accepted a position at the Institute of Electronic Data processing at the University of Agder. In 1994, Hadjerrouit was appointed an associate professor at the Department for Mathematical Sciences at the same university, teaching object-oriented programming, Web engineering, software development, and databases. Between 2004 and 2008, Hadjerrouit focused on Computer Science Education. In 2008, Hadjerrouit started to work in the field of mathematics education and use of digital tools in teaching and learning mathematics and has, since 2014, been reaching the "Theories in the Learning and Teaching of Mathematics" course. Between 2020 and 2024, Hadjerrouit led the PhD committee for Specialisation in Mathematical Sciences.

Hadjerrouit is a member of the Informing Science Institute, and of the Agder Academy of Sciences and Letters. He also served on the editorial review board of the Interdisciplinary Journal of E-Learning and Learning Objects.

As of 2026, Hadjerrouit is a professor of informatics and mathematics education at the University of Agder.

He received an “Outstanding Paper Award” for a paper he presented at the IADIS e-Society 2012 conference in Berlin.

== Selected publications ==
Hadjerrouit has authored or co-authored over 170 publications, among which are:

- Afram, O.O.; Hadjerrouit, S., & Monaghan, J. (2026). Analysing group interaction sequences in technology-mediated mathematical modelling activities. Mathematics Education Research Journal. ISSN 1033-2170. https://doi.org/10.1007/s13394-026-00568-1
- Afram, O.O.; Hadjerrouit, S., & Monaghan, J. (2026). Students’ proclivity in using particular digital tools in mathematical modelling activities: an activity and affordance theoretical perspective. International Journal of Mathematical Education in Science and Technology. ISSN 0020-739X. pp. 1–32. https://doi.org/10.1080/0020739X.2025.2598244
- Afram, O.O., & Hadjerrouit, S. (2025). Social affordances in students’ mathematical modelling with digital tools. NOMAD – Nordisk matematikkdidaktikk. ISSN 1104-2176. 30(4), pp. 166–194. https://doi.org/10.7146/nomad.v30i4.164209
- Hansen, N. K., &; Hadjerrouit, S. (2024). Supporting Students’ Mathematical Problem Solving Through Computational Thinking and Programming: A Use-Modify-Create Approach. Artificial Intelligence for Supporting Human Cognition and Exploratory Learning in the Digital Age. Cognition and Exploratory Learning in the Digital Age. ISBN 978-3-031-18512-0. Springer Nature, pp. 203-219.
- Hansen, N. K., &; Hadjerrouit, S. (2023). Analyzing Students’ Computational Thinking and Programming Skills for Mathematical Problem Solving. Open and Inclusive Educational Practice in the Digital World. ISBN 978-3-031-18512-0. Springer Nature, pp. 155–173.
- Stigberg, H.; Hadjerrouit, S.; Kaufmann, O. T.; Marentakis, G. (2022). Analysing tensions faced by pre-service mathematics teachers engaging in digital fabrication. Proceedings of the 45th Conference of the International Group for the Psychology of Mathematics Education (PME 45). ISBN 978-84-1302-178-2. Universidad de Alicante, pp. 4–51 - 4-58.
- Fleischmann, Y.; Gueudet, G.; Hadjerrouit, S.; Nicolas, P. (2020). Tertiary education in the digital age. International Network for Didactic Research in University Mathematics: INDRUM 2020;Volume 3, pp. 29–46.
- Hadjerrouit, S. (2020). Exploring the Affordances of SimReal for Learning Mathematics in Teacher Education: A Socio-Cultural Perspective. I: Computer Supported Education. 11th International Conference, CSEDU 2019, Heraklion, Crete, Greece, May 2–4, 2019, Revised Selected Papers. Springer Nature 2020, pp. 26–50.
- Fredriksen, H., & Hadjerrouit, S. (2020). Exploring engineering students’ participation in flipped mathematics classroom: A discursive approach. Nordisk matematikkdidaktikk 2020; Volum 25.(1), pp. 45–64.
- Fredriksen, H., & Hadjerrouit, S. (2019). An activity theory perspective on contradictions in flipped mathematics classrooms at the university level. International Journal of Mathematical Education in Science and Technology 2019, pp. 1–11.
- Hadjerrouit, S. (2017). Assessing the Affordances of SimReal+ and their Applicability to Support the Learning of Mathematics in Teacher Education. I: Issues in Informing Science and Information Technology (IISIT), pp. 121–138. Informing Science Institute, https://doi.org/10.28945/3692
- Hadjerrouit, S.(2015). Assessing the Level of Collaborative Writing in a Wiki-Based Environment: A Case Study in Teacher Education. I: Competencies in Teaching, Learning and Educational Leadership in the Digital Age. London: Springer Verlag, 197-216.
- Hadjerrouit, S.(2014). Wiki as a Collaborative Writing Tool in Teacher Education: Evaluation and Suggestions for Effective Use. Computers in Human Behavior; Volume 32, 301-312.
- Hadjerrouit, S.(2010). Developing Web-Based Learning Resources in School Education: A User-Centered Approach. Interdisciplinary Journal of E-Learning and Learning Objects, Volume 6, pp. 115–135.
- Hadjerrouit, S. (2009). Teaching and Leaning School Informatics: A Concept-Based Pedagogical Approach. Informatics in Education, Volume 8, No. 2, pp. 227–250.
