= Richard Coke (disambiguation) =

Richard Coke (1829–1897) was an American lawyer and politician who served as the 15th Governor of Texas.

Richard Coke may also refer to:

- Richard Coke Jr. (1790–1851), Virginia congressman
- Richard Toby Coke (born 1954), English politician

== See also ==
- Richard Koch (born 1950), British management consultant
