= Richard Koch =

British management consultant (born 1950)

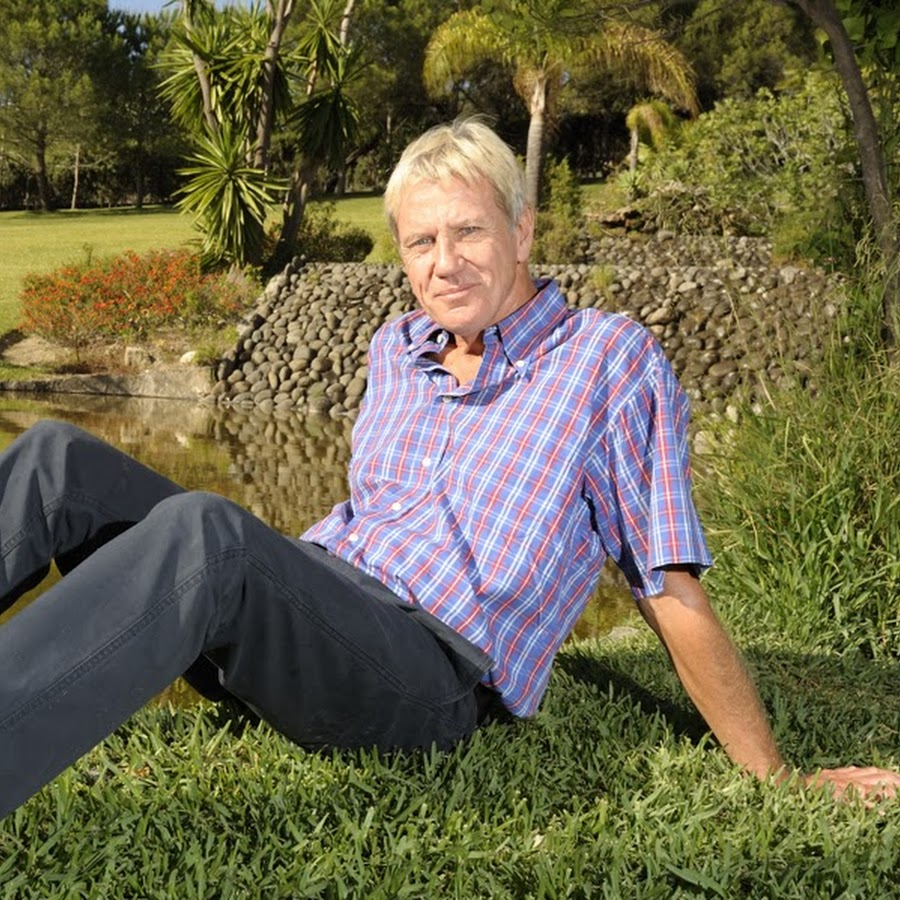
- Born: Richard John Koch; 28 July 1950; London, Britain
- Education: M.B.A. University of Pennsylvania, Wadham College, Oxford University (M.A.)
- Occupations: Author, speaker and investor
- Notable work: The 80/20 Principle
- Website: www.richardkoch.net

Richard John Koch (born 28 July 1950 in London) is a British management consultant, venture capital investor and author of books on management, marketing and lifestyle. He is best known for popularizing the application of the Pareto principle, also known as the "80/20 rule", in business and personal life through his book The 80/20 Principle (1997,2022). He has written more than 25 books on business, strategy and lifestyle, which have been published in over 44 languages.

== Early life and education ==
Koch was born in London. He studied at Wadham College, Oxford University (M.A.) and later earned an M.B.A. from the Wharton School of the University of Pennsylvania. In 2024 he was appointed a Visiting Fellow of Wadham College, Oxford.

== Career ==
Koch began his career as a consultant with the Boston Consulting Group and later became a partner at Bain & Company. After leaving Bain in 1983 he co-founded L.E.K. Consulting with Iain Evans and James Lawrence.

Koch retired from consulting when he was 39 to focus on writing and investing.

After leaving consulting, Koch invested his own capital in more than 20 companies, many of which he founded or co-founded. Businesses owned or co-owned by Koch have included Filofax, Plymouth Gin, Belgo Restaurants, Betfair, iPulse, FanDuel, Auto1, and Grind.

He is known for applying his “Star Principle” to venture investments, focusing on high-growth niche leaders. Many of his investments have returned between 5× and 53× his original stakes, and over a multi-decade period his portfolio has reportedly achieved a compound annual return of about 22 percent.

He has also been a non-executive director of several of these companies, including Filofax and Betfair, and has advised private equity firms such as Advent Limited (UK) and Brait SA, and the supermarket chain Pick 'n Pay in South Africa.

== Writing and ideas ==
Koch’s flagship work, The 80/20 Principle (1997), extended the Pareto principle to business, time management and personal life and has sold more than a million copies worldwide.

In Unreasonable Success, published by Piatkus/Entrepreneur Press, Koch identifies nine “landmarks” of extraordinary achievement including Self-belief, Olympian Expectations, One Breakthrough Achievement, Thrive on Setbacks, Acquire Unique Intuition and Distort Reality.

Recurring themes in Koch’s writing include the 80/20 principle, the Star Principle, simplicity, and the strength of weak links. He has also written forewords for related works, such as 80/20 Sales and Marketing by Perry Marshall.

== Publications ==
- The 80/20 Principle. Nicholas Brealey Publishing, 1997, Doubleday 1998. ISBN 0-385-49174-3
- The Power Laws. Nicholas Brealey Publishing, 2000, published in the US as The Natural Laws of Business, Doubleday 2001. ISBN 0-385-50159-5
- The 80/20 Revolution. Nicholas Brealey Publishing, 2002, published in the US as The 80/20 Individual, Doubleday, 2003. ISBN 0-385-50957-X
- Living the 80/20 Way. Nicholas Brealey Publishing, 2004. ISBN 1-85788-331-4
- Superconnect: the power of networks and the strength of weak links. Little, Brown/WW Norton, 2010. ISBN 978-0-393-07160-3.
- The Star Principle: How It Can Make You Rich. Piatkus Books, 2010, ISBN 978-0-7499-2962-6
- Financial Times Guide to management' : Financial Times Prentice Hall, 2013. Copies in 243 libraries, according to WorldCat
- The 80/20 Manager: Ten ways to become a Great Leader. Piatkus/Little Brown, 2013 ISBN 978-0-7499-5925-8
- The 80/20 Principle and 92 Other Powerful Laws of Nature: The Science of Success. Nicholas Brealey Publishing, 2014. ISBN 978-1-85788-611-5 & ISBN 978-1-85788-918-5
- Simplify (with Greg Lockwood) London : Piatkus, 2018.
- Unreasonable Success and How to Achieve It. Piatkus/Entrepreneur Press, 2020. ISBN 978-0349422923.
