= Online disinhibition effect =

Lack of restraint in online interactions

The online disinhibition effect refers to the lack of self-control one feels when communicating online relative to communicating offline. Individuals often perceive heightened safety when communicating online, as they can remain completely anonymous on specific websites. This anonymity diminishes concerns about potential repercussions, such as physical harm or other punitive measures. Apart from anonymity, other factors such as asynchronous communication, empathy deficit, or individual personality and cultural factors also contribute to online disinhibition. The manifestations of such an effect could be in both positive and negative directions; thus, online disinhibition could be classified as either benign disinhibition or toxic disinhibition.

The term was originally introduced by John Suler, a professor of psychology at Rider University, in his 2004 paper, "The Online Disinhibition Effect," published in the journal Cyberpsychology, Behavior, and Social Networking. People had been noticing flaming and aggressive behavior on message boards for a while already, but Suler was the one who mapped out exactly why people behave so differently in cyberspace than in real life.

== Classifications ==
Benign online disinhibition describes a situation in which people get some benefit from the absence of restraint in cyberspace. One example of benign online disinhibition can be seen as self-disclosure. With the help of Internet anonymity, people could share personal feelings or disclose themselves in the way they are reluctant to exhibit in real life. For instance, young people feel relieved when revealing untold secrets or personally embarrassing details in online chats. Such self-disclosures enable people to establish an intimate interpersonal relationship sooner and stronger when compared with real life face-to-face communication. The online disinhibition effect also provides chances to express themselves for people who are unwilling to communicate in the real world, like people who are introverted, shy, socially phobic and individuals with a stutter or impaired hearing.

Another type of online disinhibition is called "toxic disinhibition," which represents an increased tendency towards online flaming and inappropriate behaviors. These often contain hostile language, swearing, and even threats. This norm describes the negative side effect of the loss of inhibition on the cyberspace. The antisocial behaviors caused by toxic disinhibition not only occur in multiple online platforms like social media, blogs, forums, and comment sections, but also exist in diverse forms, which include cyberbullying, social loafing and more.

However, the distinction between benign and toxic online disinhibition is not always clear. For example, a hostile word in the online chat may damage others' self-image, but on the other hand, if the word is genuine, perhaps it may help the person on the receiving end have a better understanding of themselves. Considering the different subcultures of online communities, people may have various tolerances towards a particular social behavior. Another example would be acting as a bystander of online hate. A German study looked at the association between seeing online hate and creating online hate in teenagers and found a positive correlation between the two.

== Influencing factors ==
Anonymity, asynchronous communication, and empathy deficit contribute to online disinhibition. Furthermore, the psychological state of deindividuation—a decreased self-awareness and self-evaluation in digital platforms—strongly amplifies these factors.

Anonymity can make a person feel safe online, like a different person; one might even take on a new persona. It has been highlighted as a strong antecedent for the negative aspects of deindividuation, as it results in a reduction of normal inner restraints. When an individual's identity is hidden behind anonymous profiles or avatars, they feel much less accountable for their behavior. For example, platforms like Reddit allow users to interact under pseudonyms, increasing the likelihood of expressing extreme opinions. Research has shown anonymous users have a greater tendency to send hostile messages in chat rooms. However, anonymity does not solely lead to negative aspects; it can also reduce the fear of judgment, encouraging prosocial behavior, cooperation, and the sharing of sensitive personal experiences for emotional support.

Asynchronous communication and a lack of immediate consequences also drive disinhibition. Asynchronous communication is not happening live, meaning one can send a message and log out without getting an immediate reply. This delay between behavior and consequence facilitates impulsive actions. For example, on gaming consoles like Xbox, reports of abuse or cheating cannot be dealt with without delay, meaning individuals do not face immediate repercussions like direct face-to-face confrontation.

Empathy deficit and reduced social cues occur because mediated communication lacks non-verbal feedback like tone, facial expressions, or body language. Studies show that social cues help reduce the ambiguity of person impressions. Without them, individuals are less certain of how their actions affect others, making it harder to empathize and increasing the likelihood of dehumanizing targets.

Group dynamics and size further intensify the disinhibition effect. Deindividuation theory suggests that larger online groups (like forums or gaming communities) increase anonymity and provide a sense of belonging. This can lead individuals to lose their unique identity and adopt the group's social norms, even if they promote aggressive behavior. Large interactions can also result in group polarization, where individuals escalate their behaviors to align with extreme group norms, which is particularly prevalent in online political forums.

== Possible consequences ==
Online disinhibition and deindividuation play a significant role in the act of cyberbullying, which is illegal in many countries. Cyberbullying is the act of trying to make another person feel embarrassed, intimidated, or bad about themselves through the Internet. Anonymity usually leads to meaner comments towards others, but research also highlights the role of bystanders, often referred to as 'the invisible engine' of cyberbullying. The anonymous environment means bystanders have no knowledge of the victim, increasing the likelihood of them joining in the harassment. However, if group norms encourage positive engagement, anonymity can promote prosocial behaviors such as bystander intervention.

Racist, sexist, violent, rude, and offensive online comments are not the direct result of anonymity. Those comments arise only when other people are also saying things like that; online users tend to keep the same tone, civility/incivility, as others in online posts.

The online disinhibition effect can have a devastating effect on one's job security and future employment opportunities. Sixteen-year-old Kimberley Swann was fired from her job due to negative comments she made about her occupation on her Facebook page, while another infamous case involved a woman, Heather Armstrong, being terminated after "lampooning" her colleagues on the Internet. These are consequences of certain Internet users believing themselves to be unchained from typical social standards. The author of "Six Causes of Online Disinhibition" states that "[c]ompared with face-to-face interactions, online we feel freer to do and say what we want and, as a result, often do and say things we shouldn't".

Online disinhibition can also have positive outcomes. People who are shy and feel they cannot talk about certain things in their real lives can benefit from online disinhibition without causing harm to others. Online disinhibition can provide a safe place for people of the LGBTQ+ community (and other marginalised groups) to share information and support one another. Furthermore, deindividuation can lead to enhanced group cohesion and solidarity. As the focus on individual differences decreases, internet users often identify more strongly with their online group. This shared identity encourages cooperation and increased social support, which is particularly significant when groups focus on a common cause, such as participants in online activist movements.

== See also ==
- Antisocial personality disorder – Personality disorder
- Cyberpsychology – Field of research
- Deindividuation – Concept in social psychology
- Discrimination – Prejudicial treatment based on membership in a certain group
- Flaming (Internet) – Act of insulting and offending people on the internet
- Internet troll – Deliberately making offensive remarks online
- Ring of Gyges – Mythical magical artifact in Plato's Republic
- The Invisible Man – 1897 science fiction novel by H. G. Wells
