= 75 State Street =

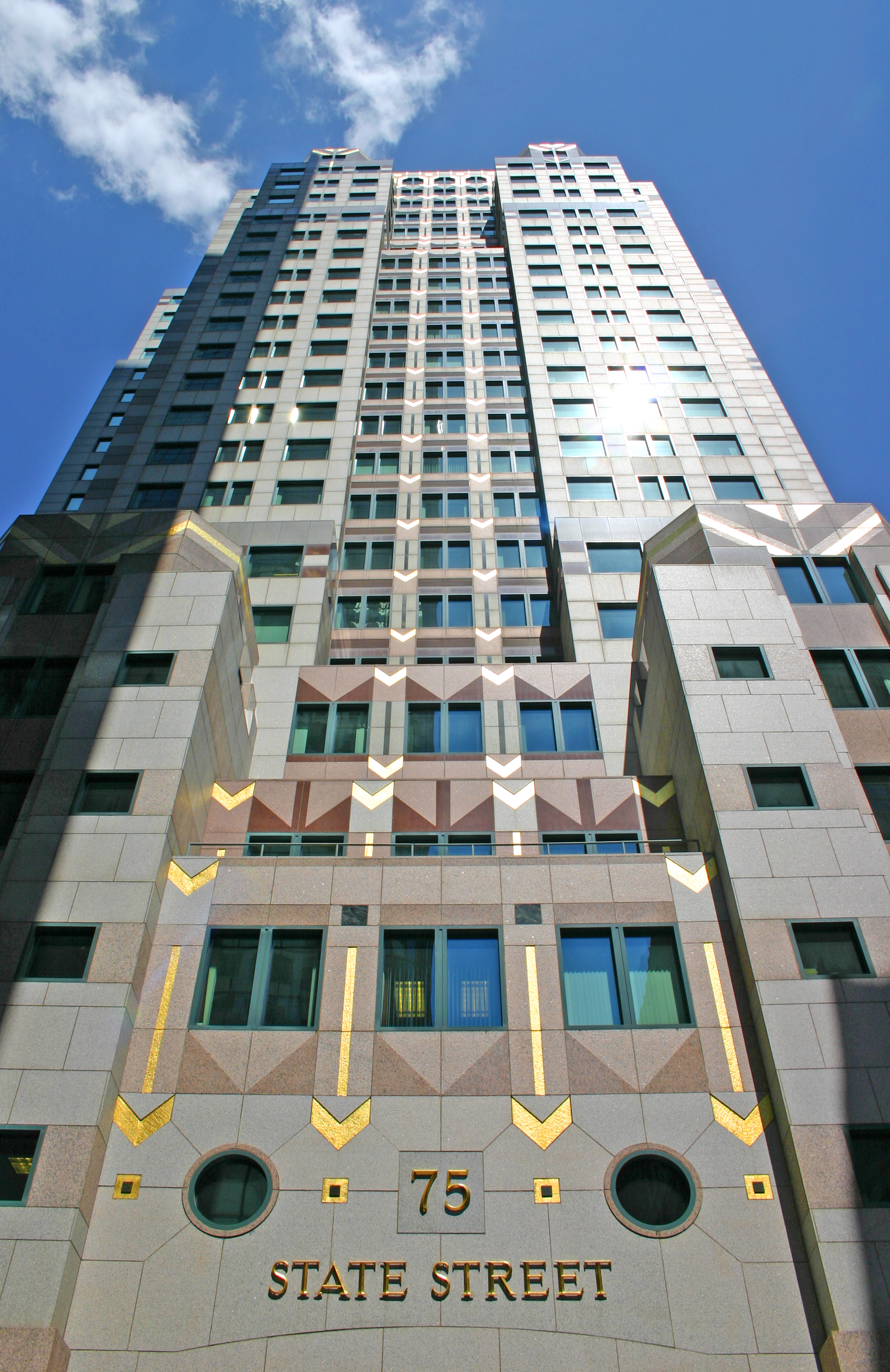
- Interactive map of the 75 State Street area

General information
- Type: Office
- Location: 75 State Street, Boston, Massachusetts
- Coordinates: 42.358512°N 71.055077°W
- Completed: 1988
- Owner: Rockpoint Group; DivcoWest

Height
- Roof: 118.9 m (390 ft)

Technical details
- Floor count: 31

Design and construction
- Architects: Gund Architects, Skidmore, Owings and Merrill

75 State Street is a high-rise office building located in the Financial District of Boston. Built in 1988, it was designed by Gund Architects of Boston, in association with Skidmore, Owings and Merrill, in the Postmodernist style. The 31-story building rises to a height of 118.9 metres (390 ft), and has a floor area of 93,088 square metres (1,001,990 sq ft).

The building is currently managed by Rockhill Management, L.L.C, an affiliate of the Rockpoint Group.

== Tenants ==
- LPL Financial
- Santander Bank
- Amwell
- Grant Thornton LLP
- Hollister Staffing
- L.E.K. Consulting
- CDM Smith
- Atlantic Global Risk LLC
- White & Case LLP
- Merchant & Gould, L.L.C.
