= International Stress Prevention Center =

International Stress Prevention Centre
- Abbreviation: CSPC
- Formation: 1981
- Founder: Mooli Lahad
- Type: NGO
- Registration no.: 58-015-488-8, 0740
- Legal status: Non-profit organization
- Headquarters: Kiryat Shmona, Israel

The International Stress Prevention Centre (aka CSPC or Community Stress Prevention Centre) established in 1981 Kiryat Shmona, Israel, is a registered NGO and a non for profit organization (NGO 58-015-488-8, 0740).

CSPC caters to differentiating circumstances – human or natural disasters, and to a variety of organizational orientations including business environments where CSPC experts evaluate and consult on business recovery and risk communications management plans.

== See also ==
- Mooli Lahad – Founder of the Community Stress Prevention Centre
