= Mary Aiken (psychologist) =

Irish Professor Cyberpsychology

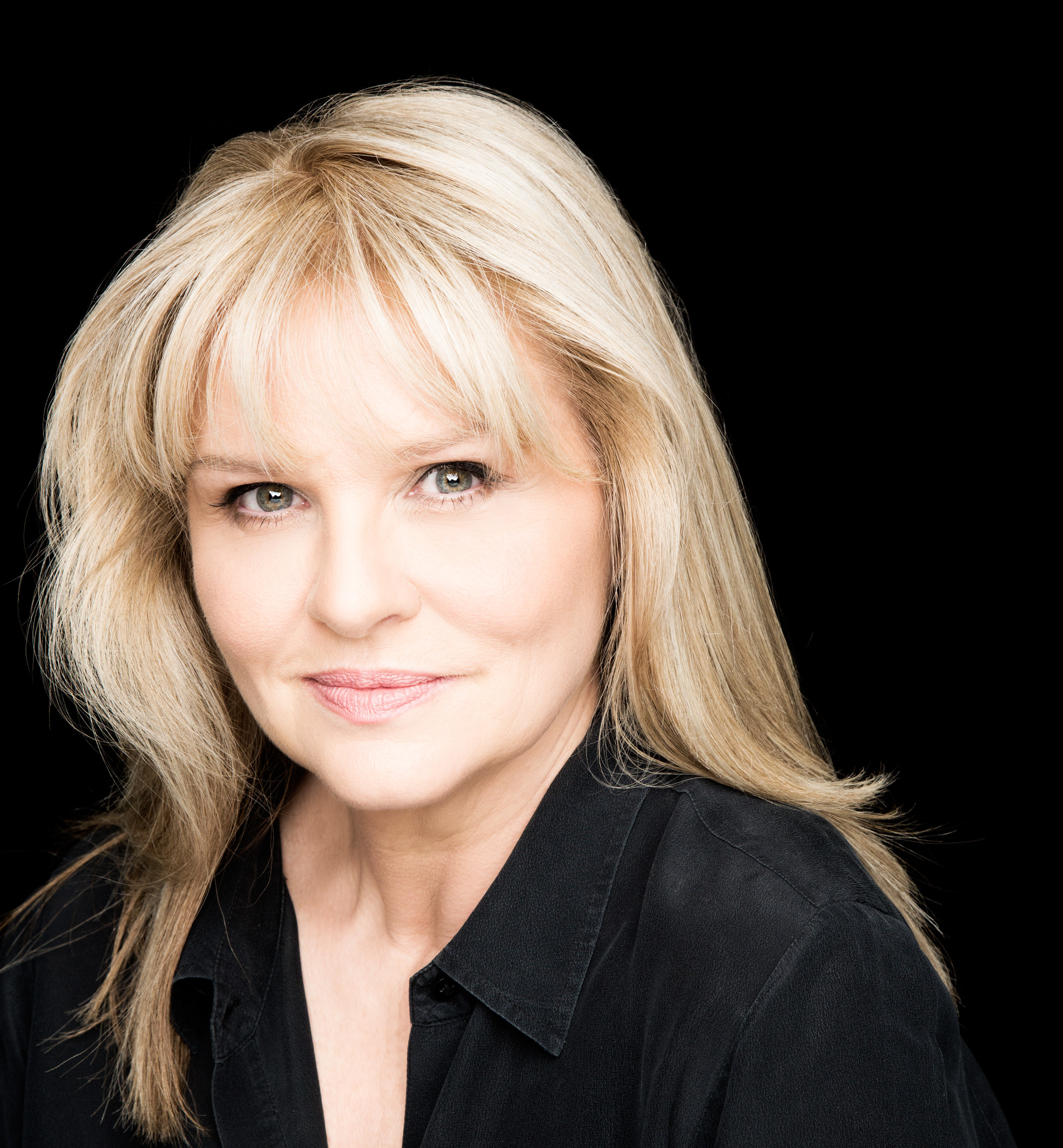
Professor Mary Aiken

Cyberpsychologist Mary Aiken is a Professor of cyberpsychology. Her book The Cyber Effect investigates the relationship between technology and human behaviour.

== Education ==
She received a Masters in Science in cyberpsychology and a Doctor of Philosophy in Forensic Cyberpsychology.

== Career ==
She is an academic advisor to Europol's European Cybercrime Centre (EC3), an Associate Professor in the Department of Law and Criminology at the University of East London (UEL) and an adviser to hedge fund the Paladin Capital Group.

She is a fellow of the Royal Society of Medicine, a fellow of the Society for Chartered IT Professionals, and a Global fellow at Wilson Center

=== Author ===
On 18 August 2016, Aiken published her book The Cyber Effect. This book investigates the relationship between technology and human behaviour. The book received the award of "Book of the Year" in the "Thought Category" by the Times, along with "Science pick" by Nature.

=== Popular culture ===
Aiken was the inspiration for the lead character, played by Patricia Arquette, in CSI: Cyber.

=== Achievements ===
She was inducted into the Infosecurity Europe Hall of Fame. In 2022, she was awarded the freedom of Dublin city.
