= Thomas Ringgold Camp =

American engineer

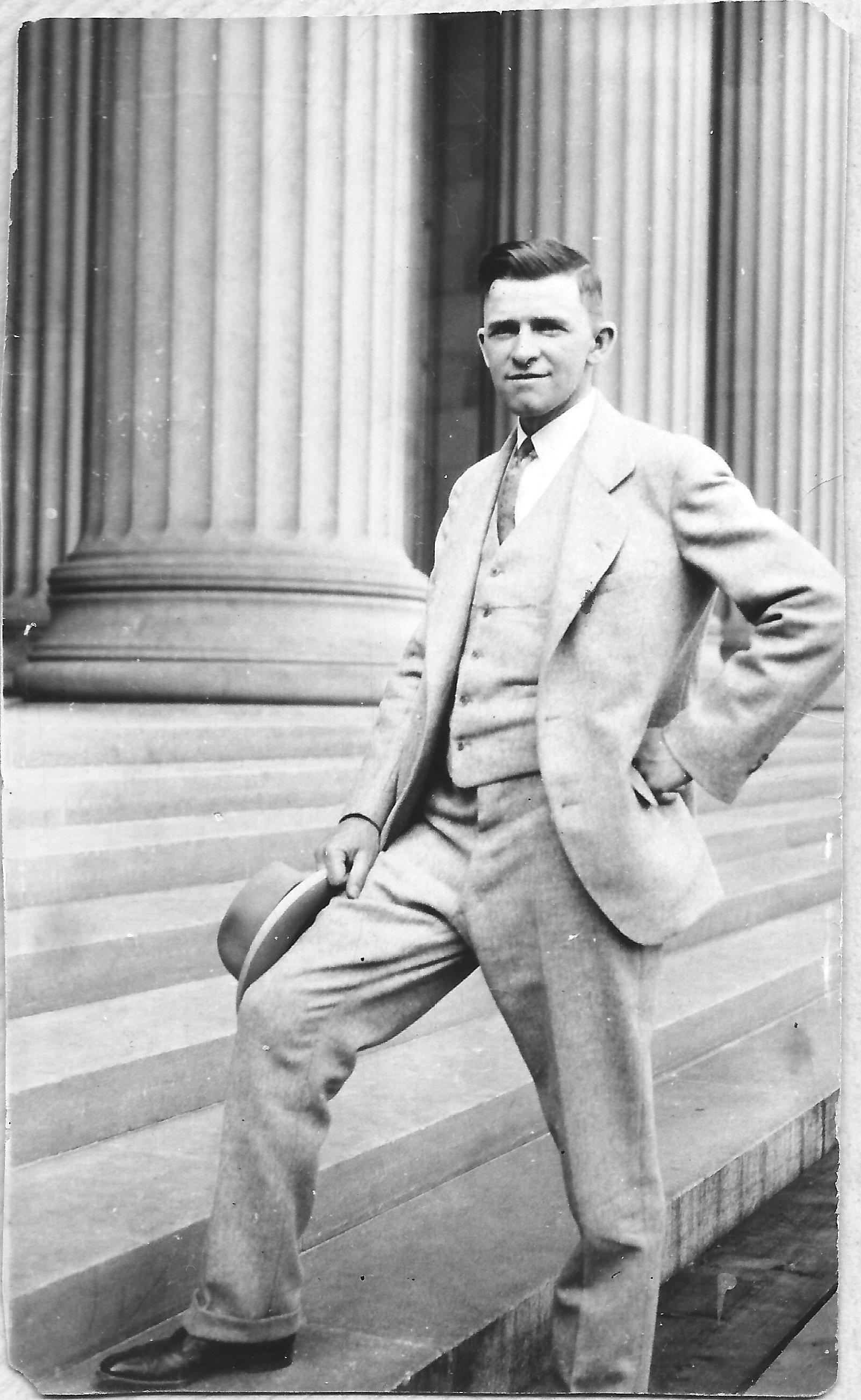
- Thomas R. Camp at MIT
- Born: 5 November 1895; San Antonio, Texas, U.S.
- Died: November 15, 1971 (aged 76); Boston, Massachusetts. U.S.
- Education: Texas A&M University; Massachusetts Institute of Technology
- Scientific career
- Fields: sanitary engineering
- Workplaces: Massachusetts Institute of Technology; Camp, Dresser & McKee

Thomas Ringgold Camp (1895–1971) was an American engineer noted for his pioneering work in sanitary engineering. He was a professor of sanitary engineering at the Massachusetts Institute of Technology (MIT) from 1929 to 1944 before forming the consulting engineering firm of Camp, Dresser & McKee.

== Early years ==
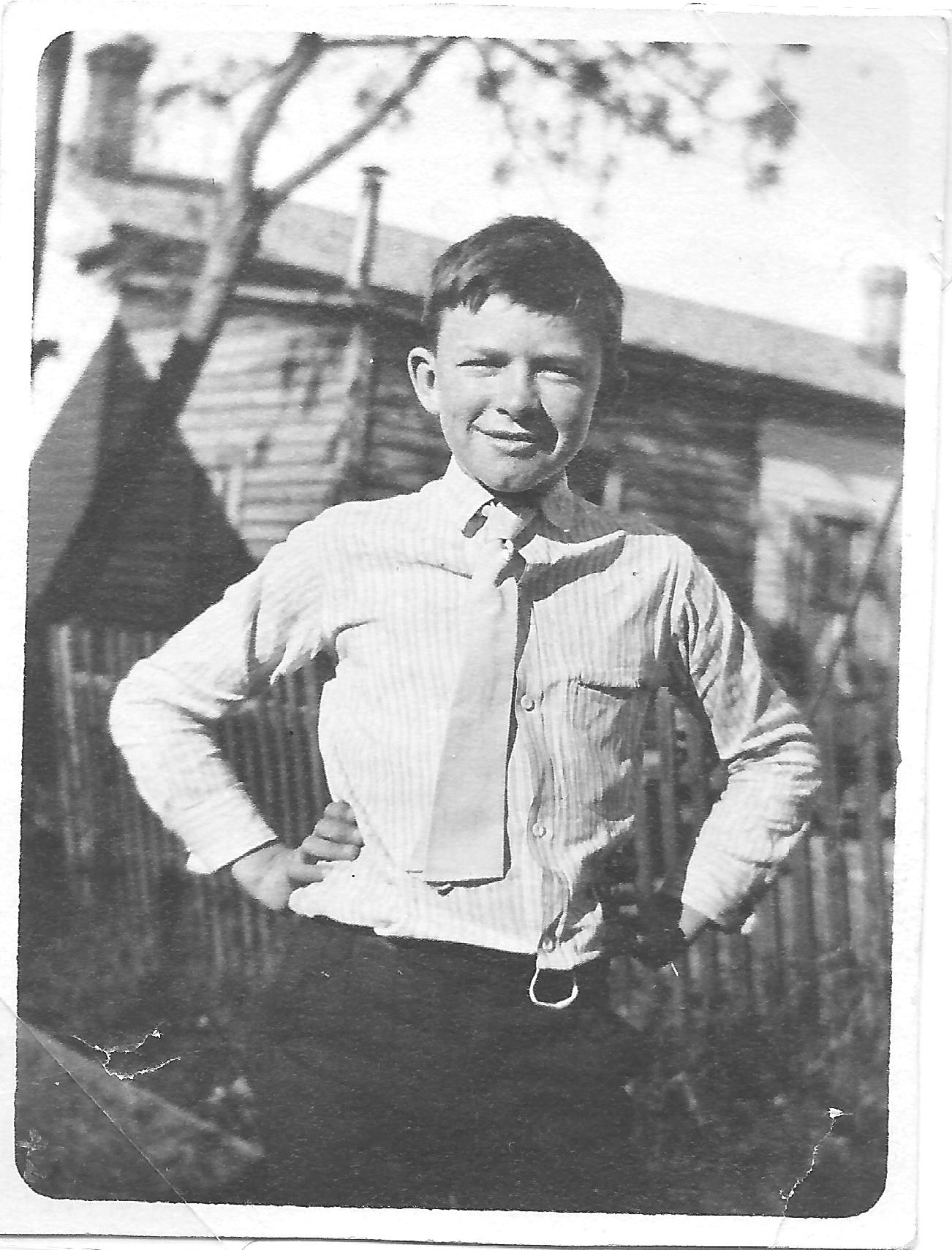
Tom Camp as a youth in Texas in the early 20th century.

Thomas was a son of Harmon Clark Camp and Mildred Stella (Dashiell) Camp. He was born 5 November 1895 in San Antonio, Texas. He received a Bachelor of Science degree in architectural engineering from Texas A&M University in 1916. Following graduation he was a lieutenant in the United States Army from 1917 to 1919 serving with heavy artillery in France during World War I. He found civilian employment with the engineering firm of Hawley & Sands serving as city engineer for the Breckenridge, Texas, waterworks and sewage treatment plant. He later oversaw a major expansion of the Fort Worth, Texas, water and sewer systems until returning to school in 1923 to earn a Master of Science degree in civil engineering from MIT in 1925. Following graduation he worked with the Greensboro, North Carolina waterworks and sewerage engineering firm of Spooner, Lewis & Camp.

== Later work ==
Camp returned to MIT as an instructor in 1929 and was rapidly promoted to head the department of sanitary engineering. Graduate students he taught to apply chemistry, bacteriology, advanced mathematics, and hydraulics to investigation of wastewater treatment became prominent in the fields of teaching or engineering practice. The results of their research caused frequent requests for his service as a consultant. These requests caused him to leave teaching in 1944 to form the Boston consulting engineering partnership of Camp, Dresser & McKee in 1947. The firm prospered through the housing boom with associated hydraulic and sanitation projects following World War II, and formed overseas offices in the 1960s. Camp was President of the New England Water Pollution Control Federation, the New England Water Works Association, and the Boston Society of Civil Engineers. He also served on the National Institutes of Health Research Grants Division Sanitation Study Section from 1946 to 1949, on the United States Public Health Service Advisory Committee for the Revision of the Drinking Water Standards from 1959 to 1962, as chairman of the American Sanitary Engineering Intersociety Board from 1956 to 1962, and as chairman of the Joint Committee for the Advancement of Sanitary Engineering from 1957 to 1958.

== Environmental perspectives ==
Camp's departure from the MIT faculty reflected his frustration with reluctance of that school's administration to offer a collaborative degree program integrating the fields of chemistry, biology, public health, and civil engineering for training sanitary engineers. While remembered for his advances in the treatment of water and wastewater, Camp was early to emphasize the importance of source control in engineering environmental solutions. A year after Rachel Carson published Silent Spring in 1962, Camp stated this perspective in his benchmark book, Water and Its Impurities:

"Neither water treatment nor wastewater treatment can be a satisfactory remedy for pollution of our watercourses by pesticide sprays or by salt used for melting snow and ice on our highways. These materials must be controlled at their points of use, because they are damaging to land, plants, and animals, as well as to water. Similarly excess soil erosion cannot be abated by water or waste treatment. Better land use is needed. In water quality problems, the whole environment must be examined."

== Professional recognition ==
The Water Pollution Control Federation established the Thomas R. Camp Medal in 1964, to be awarded annually to a Federation member who best exemplifies "the unique application of basic research or fundamental principles." The Boston Society of Civil Engineers established the Thomas R. Camp Fund in 1971, the income from which is to be used annually for one or more lectures on "outstanding recent developments in the field of sanitary engineering." Other awards include:

- 1941 – Sanitary Section Prize, Boston Society of Civil Engineers for a paper entitled: The Filtration System of the New M.I.T. Swimming Pool – Design and Operation
- 1941 – The Karl Emil Hilgard Hydraulic Prize, American Society of Civil Engineers, for a paper entitled: Lateral Spillway Channels
- 1943 – Dexter Brackett Memorial Medal, New England Waterworks Association for a paper entitled: Hydraulics of Distribution Systems – Some Recent Developments in Methods of Analysis
- 1944 – Hydraulic Section Prize, Boston Society of Civil Engineers
- 1945 – The J.C. Stevens Award, American Society of Civil Engineers for discussion of a paper by William E. Dobbins entitled: Effects of Turbulence on Sedimentation
- 1947 – The J. James R. Cores Medal, American Society of Civil Engineers, for a paper entitled: Sedimentation and Design of Settling Tanks
- 1949 – Desmond FitzGerald Medal, Boston Society of Civil Engineers, for a paper with P.C. Stein entitled: Velocity Gradient and Internal Work in Fluid Motion
- 1955 – Fuller Award, American Water Works Association for a paper entitled: Determination of Charges for Public Fire Protection
- 1956 – Dexter Brackett Memorial Medal, New England Waterworks Association
- 1956 – The Rudolph Hering Medal, American Society of Civil Engineers, for a paper entitled: Flocculation and Flocculation Basins
- 1963 – New England Award, Engineering Society of New England
- 1964 – Edmund Friedman Professional Recognition Award, American Society of Civil Engineers
- 1966 – Distinguished Service Award, National Clay Pipe Institute
- 1969 – Samuel Arnold Greeley Award, American Society of Civil Engineers, for a paper with S. David Graber entitled: Dispersion Conduits
- 1970 – Honorary Doctor of Science Degree, Clarkson College
- 1970 – Clemens Herschel Award, Boston Society of Civil Engineers
- 1972 – The J.C. Stevens Award (posthumous), American Society of Civil Engineers

== Private life ==
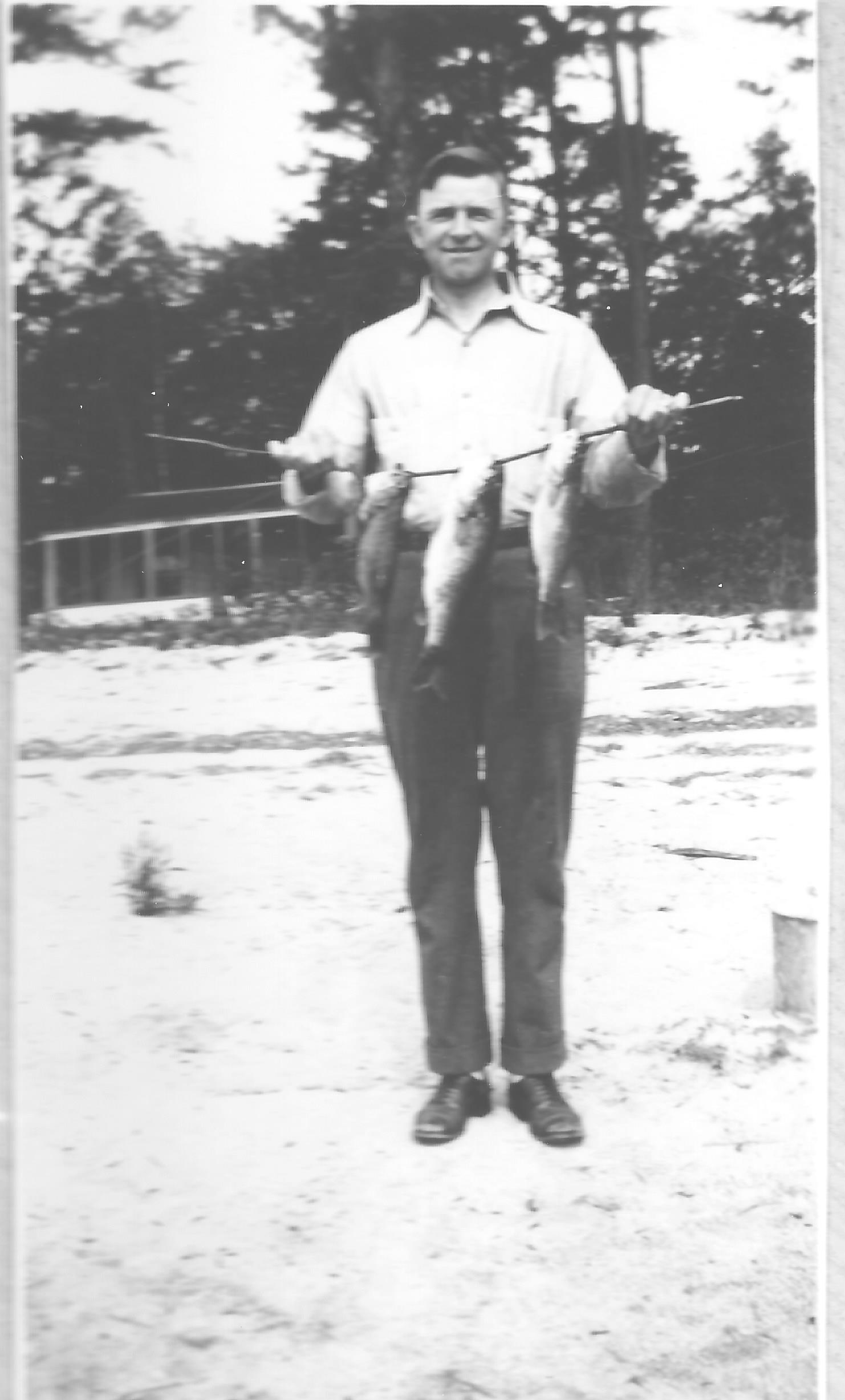
Thomas R. Camp after a day fishing.

Camp lived at the Evans' boarding house in Cambridge while a student at MIT. Upon graduation in 1925, he married the owners' daughter, Margaret Evans. All three of their children raised in Newton, Massachusetts, completed Master's degree programs. The family summer vacations were spent angling on New Hampshire lakes. Camp devoted his final years to caring for his wife after she suffered a series of strokes, and he died a year after she did.
