= Online counseling =

- Other names: online psychotherapy, internet-based therapy, internet-based counseling, internet-based psychotherapy, internet-based psychological therapies, internet-based mental health intervention, internet-delivered therapy, web-based therapy, e-therapy, e-counseling
- MeSH: D000068237

Online counseling, also known as online therapy, teletherapy, e-therapy, cyber therapy, or web-based counseling, is a form of mental health care that is delivered through the internet. Licensed or trained mental health professionals remotely communicate with clients to provide assessments, support or therapeutic services for individuals seeking counseling. Rather than conventional face-to-face interactions, these services are typically offered via email, real-time chat, or video conferencing. Online counseling may be used as an alternative to traditional psychotherapy, or nutritional counseling.

Although forms of telepsychology and telepsychiatry have been available for over 35 years, the development of digital communication technologies and the wider availability of broadband internet has influenced online therapy services. As the use of online counseling continues to expand through different platforms, clients utilize online counseling as a replacement or as a supplement to in-person treatment.

== History ==
One of the earliest demonstrations involving computer-based communication was a simulated psychotherapy session between computers at Stanford and UCLA during the International Conference on Computer Communication in October 1972. Although the interaction was a simulation and not actual counseling, it contributed to the growing interest on how emerging network technologies might be used for therapeutic communication. As access to the internet, bulletin boards, and online services expanded throughout the 1980s, online communication became common, and virtual self-help groups naturally developed. These self-help groups were often considered precursors to online counseling due to them demonstrating how individuals could seek emotional support through digital communication. Furthermore, with the public release of the World Wide Web in the early 1990s, mental health professionals began creating websites offering mental health information. Along with this some practitioners began to receive requests for personal help through the platform. The responses to these requests lead to the advent of online counseling.

Early documentation on the development of online counseling was produced by Martha Ainsworth in 1995, who began searching for a therapist due to her having psychological complaints. Her frequently traveling made it difficult for her to consult a face-to-face therapist, and therefore, she needed an effective alternative, someone she could consult with mobile like an online therapist. At that time, she only found a small number of web pages that offered psychological support or therapy services online. Due to the scarcity, Ainsworth later created a clearinghouse for mental health websites known as Metanoia, which is a Greek word meaning "a change of mind," and it aimed to provide the public with accessible information about online mental health resources. By 2000, Metanoia contained over 250 websites of private practices and more than 700 online clinics where individuals could initiate contact with a therapist.

According to metanoia.org, the first service to offer online mental healthcare was "Ask Uncle Ezra", a platform created by staff at Cornell University in 1986 to provide support to students. By the mid-1990s, several fee-based online services providing mental health advice had emerged, reflecting growing public interest in digital mental health resources. Additionally, between 1994 and 2002, a group of trained volunteer crisis counselors called "Samaritans", began providing suicide prevention services via email. Since that time, the number of online counseling providers and support groups has continued to increase, influenced by the expansion of web-based services and anonymity associated with virtual sessions.

== Advantages and disadvantages of online counseling ==
=== Advantages ===
Online counseling offers several advantages. These include:

- Increased accessibility: Research has shown that clients come from a diverse range of ages, backgrounds, and concerns. Rural residents, individuals with disabilities expatriates, and under-served minorities often find it easier to locate a suitable therapist online than within their local communities. Online counseling also makes therapy more accessible for clients who face difficulties in keeping appointments during regular business hours, leading to a decrease in missed appointments for in-person sessions. In addition to improving access to therapists, online counseling enhances clients' access to information. In traditional face-to-face counseling, information is stored only with the therapists. However, in online counseling, both therapists and clients can access the transcripts of their communications, which allows people seeking therapy to monitor changes in their own conditions.
- Increased comfort and convenience: Online counseling can offer higher comfort and convenience for clients and therapists alike. Therapists or clients may not need to travel for their sessions, which may be less expensive and more comfortable for all involved. In addition to the convenience, many people also enjoy the perceived confidentiality that comes with online counseling. They tend to feel more comfortable sharing information with their mental health professional and may feel less ashamed and powerless due to the removed environment.
- Less expensive: Although most therapists charge the same fees for teleconsultations as they would for direct counseling, teletherapy can be relatively less expensive as it does not involve travel costs if both parties have internet access from where there are.
- Reduced stigma: Online access to therapy may help reduce some of the stigma associated with seeking mental health services, such as its effectiveness, by allowing clients to engage privately and outside the clinical settings. The increased privacy can make it easier for some people to initiate conversations about mental health concerns and participate in counseling without social pressure that may occur in an in-person setting.

=== Disadvantages ===
Some of the disadvantages of online counseling include:

- Anonymity and privacy: Online counseling uses technology-aided devices and internet as the main medium for communication between the therapist and the client, meaning that personal and sensitive information is stored on digital platforms or devices. Because of this, there is a potential risk of data theft or unauthorized access if appropriate safeguards aren't in place. While online counseling may feel more private to some users, digital communication can be vulnerable to potential breaches of privacy in online counseling. For example, non-encrypted electronic Internet communications might be intercepted, and records could be accessed by family members or hackers. It is important to establish the safety of the site and verification of therapist or client before beginning an online counseling session.
- Finding the right match for therapeutic needs of clients: Due to the lack of in-person contact in online counseling, there can be an absence of social and nonverbal cues, such as body language and facial expressions, which may limit a therapist's ability to recognize indicators of emotional distress, including anger, tension, or irritation. It can also cause the sessions to be more straight to the point and less emotionally gradual, which can be beneficial or not depending on the client's needs.
- Establishing authenticity of therapists or counselors: Counselors and therapists are professional health care providers and therefore must hold valid licenses to undertake clients for counseling as a part of their mandatory professional requirements. As online platforms allow clients to connect with therapists from across the world, establishing legitimacy and authenticity of the therapists or counselors may be difficult. Cross-jurisdictional issues create ethical and legal concerns, due to professional qualifications of online counselors becoming challenging in digital environments. This emphasizes the importance of clients ensuring that online therapists are appropriately credentialed before initiating services.
- Unreliable technology: Slow internet, software disruptions or power outages are some of the technological challenges that can interfere with the effectiveness of online counseling sessions.
- Requirement for digital literacy: The digital literacy of older adults is increasing substantially, research indicates that six in ten seniors use the internet and 77% own a cell phone. However, despite this increase in access, many older adults continue to face challenges in adapting to newer technological developments. International studies from 2009 to 2020 have shown that older adults generally report lower levels of online communication and collaboration, reduced digital safety awareness, and less positive attitudes toward technology usage.
- Insurance and cost barriers: Insurance coverage for online counseling varies across providers, states, and the individual's health plans. Among online therapy, insurance acceptance differs with some platforms accepting dozens of insurance plans while others require clients to pay out of pocket. Additionally, clients may still face copays or costs comparable to in-person care, depending on the plan and deductible requirements. As of current, various online therapy platforms have incorporated insurance coverage into their services, such as Amwell, Teladoc Health, Talkspace, Brightside Health, and Cerebral.

== Medical uses and effectiveness ==
Although preliminary evidence suggest that online counseling may help populations that tend to underutilize traditional in-office counseling, questions regarding its overall effectiveness and appropriateness still has not been resolved.

=== Mental health ===
Research by G.S. Stofle suggests that online counseling may be beneficial for individuals functioning at a moderately high level. Similarly, J. Suler suggests that people functioning at a particularly high level, and who are well-educated and artistically inclined, may benefit the most from using text-based online counseling as a complement to ongoing psychotherapy. However, severe mental health situations, such as suicidal ideation or a psychotic episode, may require traditional face-to-face interventions for safety and clinical appropriateness, although further research may prove otherwise.

Cohen and Kerr conducted a study on the effectiveness of online therapy for treatment of anxiety disorders among university students and found no significant differences in treatment outcomes between online and in-person modalities, as measured by the State-Trait Anxiety Inventory.

As the main goal of counseling is to alleviate the distress, anxiety or concerns experienced by a client when entering therapy, online counseling demonstrates strong efficacy under that definition. Research has come to show that the effects and benefits online counseling has to offer is equivalent or comparable to those of in-person counseling. This suggests that therapeutic effects can be available to patients without requiring clients to travel to an office, wait in a waiting room, or leave the comfort of their home. Client satisfaction surveys have also demonstrated a generally high client satisfaction with online counseling, although the providers sometimes demonstrate lower satisfaction with distance methods.

=== Nutrition counseling ===
Nutrition counseling addresses specific health concerns, such as dietary habits and nutrient intake. Many consultants offer their services online through Skype or other digital face-to-face tools. This approach can be effective for individuals with a busy work schedule, and others who cannot make it to an office regularly. Online nutrition counseling may support the management of conditions, such as imbalances in blood lipid levels, blood sugar regulation, and other health concerns through nutritional approaches.

=== Smoking cessation ===
The effectiveness of real-time video counseling for helping people to stop smoking is unclear. Few studies have compared the effects of video-based and telephone-based counseling on smoking cessation. However, current research indicates that web-based interventions incorporating components of evidence-based therapies, such as cognitive behavioral therapy, motivational interviewing, and acceptance and commitment therapy, can significantly reduce smoking rates for some cancer survivors, particularly those with a higher nicotine dependency. Further research is needed to identify more predictors and moderators that influence engagement and effectiveness within these online intervention models.

== New technological applications in online counseling ==
Online counseling has continued to evolve alongside advancements in technology and therapeutic software programs. There are now apps and programs being developed to make the complex processes of therapy and planning manageable and accessible for the patient through their smartphone. These tools often provide resources for self-monitoring, self-improvement activities, treatment management, and the documentation of personal trends and symptoms.

"MyCompass" is a specific self-help program that many online counselors use to support patients. This tool helps track factors associated with treatment plans including, mood, personal log data, and diary entries, allowing the program to examine therapeutic factors and present insights that may be useful to both the client and the practitioner. When programs like "MyCompass" are used in online counseling, they must establish ethical and legal frameworks that guide digital mental health practice. These include ensuring that clients receive informed consent in an online format, where the program's purpose, limitations, data-use policies, and potential risks are all clearly communicated before engagement.

== Online counseling and COVID-19 ==
Online counseling increased dramatically in 2020 during the COVID-19 pandemic as government issued nationwide lockdowns and social-distancing mandates to control the spread of the virus. Consequently, mental health professionals were unable to meet with their clients in person, prompting a rapid and large-scale transition to telehealth to maintain continuity of care. In addition to this transition, the pandemic and extended quarantine periods contributed to anxiety and depression across the population, which resulted in a heightened demand for mental health services. Because online counseling became so prominent during this period, the overall reliance on telehealth for mental health care remained even as social distancing eased and in-person services resumed.

== See also ==
- Cyberpsychology
- Social media therapy
- Telephone counseling
- Telehealth
- Psychotherapy
