= Telepsychology =

Use of telemedicine in psychotherapy

Telepsychology is the use of telemedicine within the practice of psychotherapy, wherein a medical professional uses online tools to assist patients. Some tools may include, but are not limited to: Zoom (software), Skype, email, online chatting, Oovoo, text-messaging, phone call, or using a smart phone app. Not only is telepsychology cost-effective, it also helps connect medical professionals to underserved patients while being more comforting and convenient to both parties. Tele interventions (e.g. Zoom) can also be combined with online interventions (e.g. online modules, psychoeducation, or training diaries). Such formats indicate comparable therapy mechanisms as known from face-to-face therapy (e.g. changes in cognitive style, behavior changes)

== Guidelines ==
There are guidelines and standards that must be met for a medical professional to successfully and effectively utilize their tools to aid their patients. ACPRO also has a model of standards for how one can conduct an adequate telepsychology service delivery.

== Evidence ==
Though it is understandable that critics will argue that telepsychology practices are not as effective as in-person practices, but there's enough evidence to suggest otherwise. One notable study conducted by APA Psych Net shows that there are no significant differences between telepsychology and in-person practices.

== See also ==
- Online counseling
- Social media therapy
- Telephone counseling
- Telepsychiatry
