= CDM Smith =

American engineering company

CDM Smith Inc.
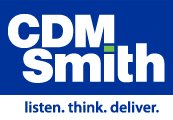

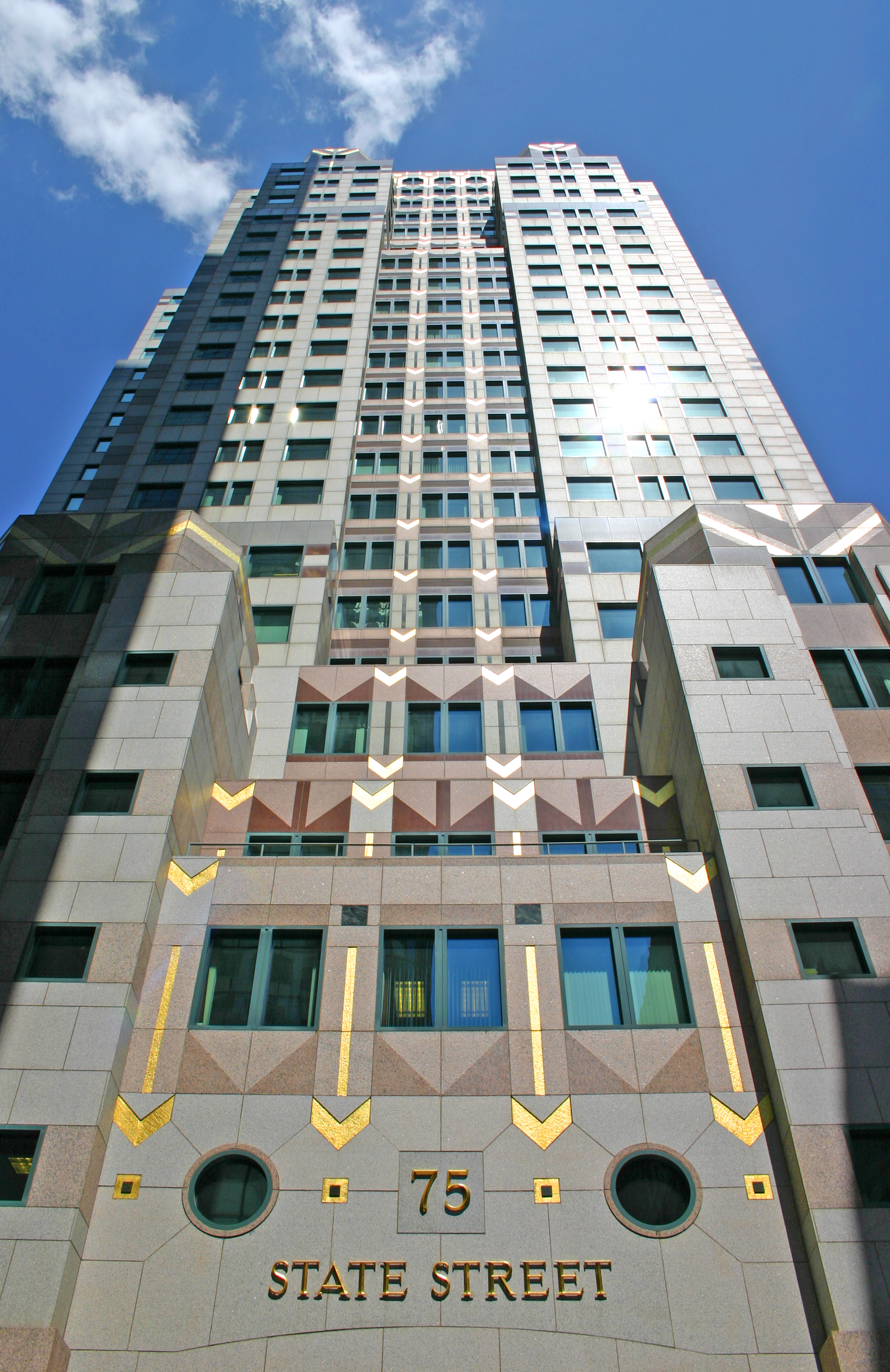
- Headquarters at 75 State Street in Boston
- Type: Private
- Industry: Global Engineering Services; Architectural Services; Engineering Consulting; Full service Design Build Construction and Engineering Firm
- Founded: 1947; 79 years ago
- Headquarters: 75 State Street, Boston, Massachusetts, US
- Area served: Worldwide
- Key people: Timothy B. Wall (Chairman and CEO); Anthony B. Bouchard (President and COO)
- Number of employees: 7,000
- Website: cdmsmith.com

CDM Smith Inc. is an American engineering and construction company headquartered in Boston, Massachusetts. CDM Smith offers services in water, environment, transportation, energy and facilities projects for public and private clients. Major services include design, consulting and program management with a focus on emerging areas such as polyfluoroalkyl substances (PFAS), complete corridors, lead in drinking water, digital solutions, and water reuse and desalination. The employee-owned company is currently ranked 22nd on Engineering News-Record's 2025 Top 500 Design Firms list and 25th on their 2025 Top 200 Environmental Firms list.

== History ==
Camp Dresser & McKee (CDM) was founded in 1947 by Thomas Ringgold Camp with partners Herman Dresser and Jack McKee. Due to Camp’s background in sanitary engineering, the company initially focused on drinking water infrastructure programs in New England. In the 1960s when the firm started accepting contracts internationally in Colombia and Bangladesh, the firm grew to become a global engineering and construction firm. Through numerous acquisitions in the 1970s, as well as partnering with the U.S. EPA in 1973 and other federal agencies in 1985, CDM Smith expanded to offer services in clean water, hazardous waste and the environment, transportation, energy, and facilities sectors on a national and international scale. Today, the company has nearly 5,000 employees in 131 offices, with 85 offices being in the United States.

In 2011, CDM acquired Wilbur Smith, a 1,000-employee transportation engineering firm, to form CDM Smith. CDM Smith later acquired the Ohio-based Louis Perry Group in late 2014 as an independent subsidiary to expand its industrial expertise in the rubber and plastic industry. In 2015, CDM Smith moved its headquarters from a 180,000 square foot space at 50 Hampshire St, Cambridge, Massachusetts, to a 120,000 sq ft office space at 75 State Street in Boston. In 2021, CDM Smith acquired Milestone Solutions, a North America–based firm specializing in road usage charging and pricing.

In January 2022, CDM Smith formed a new subsidiary, Trinnex, to offer digital services and software to U.S. municipal clients. Trinnex offers software as service products, including pipeCAST, leadCAST, epiCAST and precipiCAST for water, lead pipes, epidemics and weather tracking and insights. Their digital services include risk, performance, and capital planning; digital strategy and transformation; decision analytics and optimization; and digital twin design and development. Trinnex is headquartered in Manchester, New Hampshire, with nearly 50 employees distributed across the Unit.

On June 21, 2017, the US Justice Department declined to prosecute CDM Smith for corruption, despite finding that the company had paid $1.18 million to officials in India. In July 2017, CDM Smith agreed to pay around $4 million to the US Treasury, after which investigations by the Fraud Section of the Criminal Division of the Department of Justice into bribery were closed. CDM Smith has been sanctioned by the World Bank for "failing to disclose a subcontract on a project in Vietnam", and was conditionally non-de-barred for one and half years. On July 15, 2017, it was announced that the Goa government had asked state chief secretary Dharmendra Sharma to investigate bribes from CDM Smith in India. Based on Special Investigation Team (SIT) of Central Vigilance Commission (India's anti-corruption watchdog), India's Central Bureau of Investigation (parallel to US's FBI) filed first FIR in this case on February 2, 2018.

In 2025, CDM Smith was the recipient of the Mentoring Excellence Award at the Absorbies Awards, Absorb Software’s annual awards program, for its mentorship program Career Compass, launched in 2014. In 2026, CDM Smith was recognized with the 2026 Platinum Award for Excellence in Client Experience by Client Savvy, a customer experience management platform.

== Principal subsidiaries ==
CDM Smith's principal subsidiaries are:

- CDM Constructors Inc.
- CDM Federal Programs Corporation
- CDM International Inc.
- CDM Smith SE (Germany)
- CDM Smith Danismanlik ve Mühendislik Ltd. (Turkey)
- CDM Smith Sp.z.o.o. (Poland)
- The Louis Perry Group
- Trinnex

== Significant projects ==
- Houston Northeast Water Purification Plant expansion; a $1.8B progressive design-build project considered the largest of its kind
- Newark Lead Service Line Replacement Program; considered the "national model" for lead pipe replacement in the US
- Wadi Al Arab System II Water Conveyance Project; a $129.5M project to provide drinking water to the Kingdom of Jordan
- Metropolitan Atlanta Rapid Transit Authority (MARTA)'s bus rapid transit in Clayton County, Georgia; MARTA's largest bus rapid project to date
- MassDOT All-Electronic Tolling System; replacing all toll booths on the Massachusetts Turnpike with transponders
- Brunswick County Northwest WTP Expansion: removing PFAS to undetectable levels with reverse osmosis for a North Carolina community
- Water Purification Technology Program and R&D Testing Project in Jacksonville, Florida; exploring an alternative water supply for the eighth-largest community-owned utility in the US
- TxDOT US 67 Corridor Master Plan; with outreach that included bilingual communications, mixed reality activities, online maps and tools, and extensive public meetings
- Metolong Dam and Water Supply Program in Lesotho; providing potable water for more than 500,000 people in the region
- All-Electric Bus Rapid Transit System, Indianapolis; considered the "next evolution" of bus rapid transit systems
- DC Water Waste-to-Energy Project; a $470M project producing a net 10 MW of electricity from the wastewater treatment process
- Eversource Geothermal Energy Network; first-in-the-nation utility-led pilot project to provide customers in Framingham, Massachusetts, with heating and cooling from a renewable source
- Hawaii Road Usage Charge (RUC) Program; fair, forward-looking solution ensuring long-term, sustainable funding for transportation

== Bibliography ==
- "International Directory of Company Histories". Gale Virtual Reference Library. Gale. 2015.
- "Company Overview of CDM Smith Inc". Bloomberg L.P. 2016.
- "Engineering News-Record Top Lists". Engineering News-Record. 2015.
- "Times Change, and We Change With Them". CDM Smith. 2016.
- "Wilbur Smith Associates brand retired, becoming part of a new CDM Smith". Toll Road News. 2011. Archived from the original on 2016-03-13.
- "CDM Smith moves headquarters from Cambridge to Boston". Boston Business Journal. 2015.
- "Wadsworth's Louis Perry is retiring on his own terms". The Medina Gazette. 2014.
