= Computers in Human Behavior =

- Discipline: Computer science, human–computer interaction, cyberpsychology
- Language: English
- Edited by: Matthieu Guitton

Publication details
- History: 1985–present
- Publisher: Elsevier
- Frequency: Monthly
- Impact factor: 8.9 (2024)

Standard abbreviations
- ISO 4: Comput. Hum. Behav.

Indexing
- ISSN: 0747-5632

Links
- Journal homepage; Online access

Computers in Human Behavior is a monthly peer-reviewed academic journal covering human-computer interaction and cyberpsychology. It was established in 1985 and is published by Elsevier. The editor-in-chief is Matthieu Guitton (Laval University). In 2020, the journal launched a companion gold open-access peer-reviewed title, Computers in Human Behavior Reports. In 2023, the fourth sister journal was launched: Computers in Human Behavior: Artificial Humans.

== Abstracting and indexing ==
According to the Journal Citation Reports, the journal has a 2024 impact factor of 8.9.
