= L.E.K. Consulting =

International strategy consulting firm

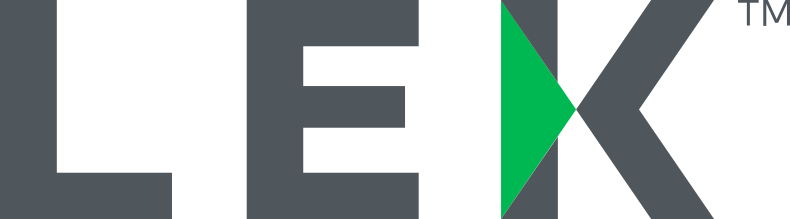

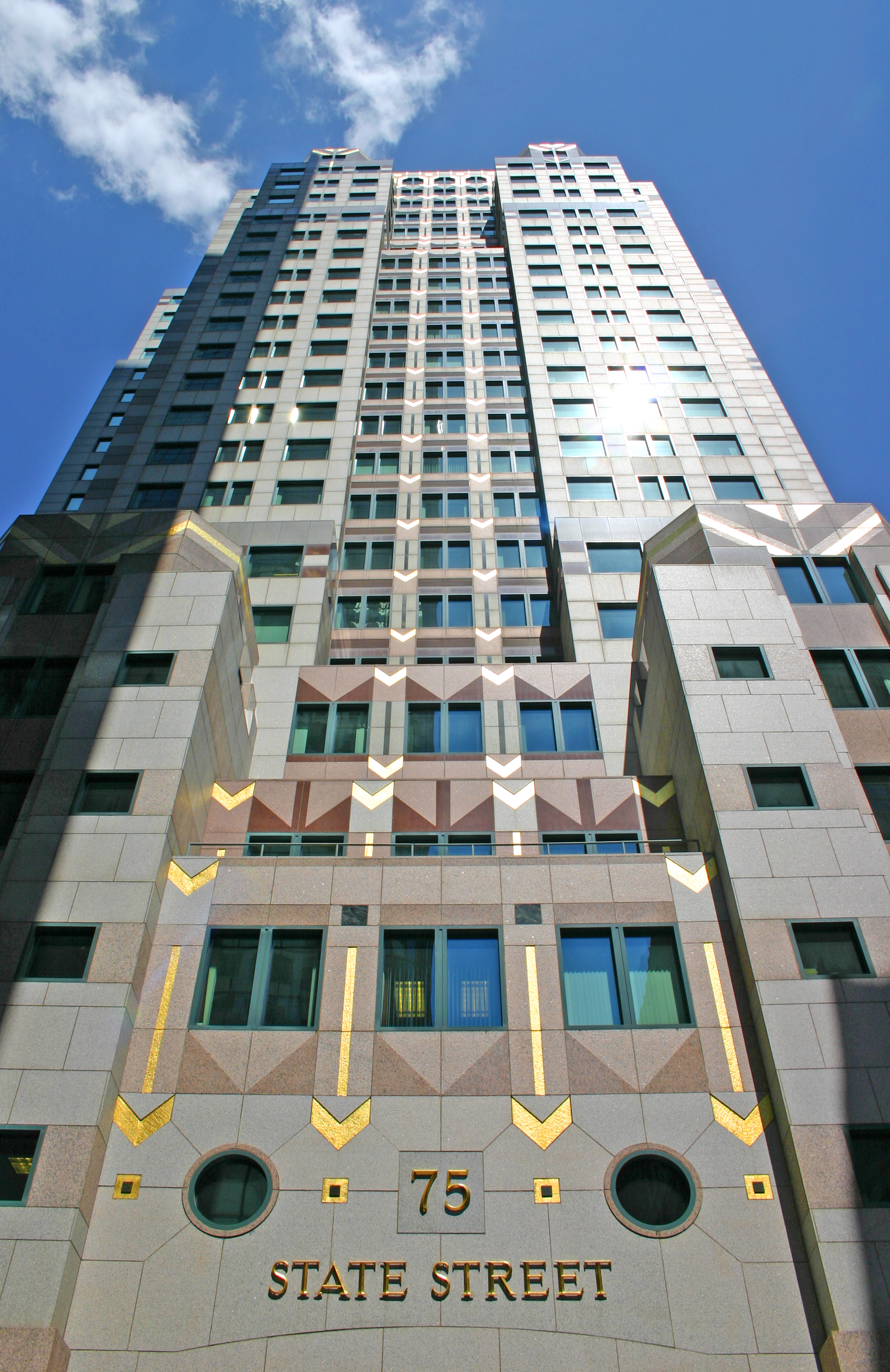
- Headquarters at 75 State Street
- Type: Partnership
- Industry: Management consulting
- Founded: 1983; 43 years ago
- Founder: James Lawrence, Iain Evans, Richard Koch
- Headquarters: 75 State Street, Boston, Massachusetts, United States
- Number of locations: 21
- Key people: Iain Evans, Global Chairman
- Revenue: ▲US$800 million (2021)
- Number of employees: c.2,100 (2023)
- Website: www.lek.com

L.E.K. Consulting is a global strategy consulting firm based in London and Boston. Founded in 1983 by three partners from Bain & Company, L.E.K. focuses on corporate strategy, marketing and sales, mergers and acquisitions, and operations. It provides expertise to life sciences and pharma, healthcare services, consumer products, financial services, energy and environment, media and entertainment, technology, travel and transport, industrials, and retail. The firm also has a strong private equity practice.

== History ==
In 1983, three Bain partners from London – James Lawrence, Iain Evans and Richard Koch – left and founded L.E.K.

L.E.K. merged with Alcar Consulting Group in 1993. Founded in 1979, Alcar pioneered value-based management (VBM) principles that maximized result impact for clients.

Projects include providing strategic and commercial advice for the U.K. government on the privatisation of passenger train operating companies in the mid-1990s, assisting the launch of one of the first pure direct internet banks in 1996, and transforming a global pharmaceutical company into an industry leader in 2009.

In 2007, L.E.K. was awarded the Queen's Award for Enterprise for international trade and export. In 2008, L.E.K. became the first global major management consulting firm to hold carbon neutral status. In 2022, the firm was ranked 9th by Firsthand in the "Vault Consulting 50".

L.E.K. utilizes a local staffing model, where consultants travel less compared to other firms.
