= Amwell (company) =

American telemedicine company

American Well Corporation
- Trade name: Amwell
- Type: Public
- Traded as: NYSE: AMWL
- Industry: Healthcare
- Founded: June 2006; 20 years ago (as American Well)
- Founders: Ido Schoenberg (president and CEO); Roy Schoenberg (chairman and CEO)
- Headquarters: 75 State Street, Boston, Massachusetts, U.S.
- Area served: United States
- Key people: Muneer Satter, investor
- Services: Mobile and web patient-to-physician teleconferencing
- Revenue: US$ 245.3 Mio. (2020)
- Number of employees: 812 (2021)
- Website: amwell.com

American Well Corporation, doing business as Amwell, is a telemedicine company based in Boston, Massachusetts, that connects patients with doctors over secure video. Amwell sells its platform as a subscription service to healthcare providers to put their medical professionals online and its proprietary software development kits, APIs, and system integrations enable clients to embed telehealth into existing workflows utilized by providers and patients.

Amwell has roughly 800 employees and has raised more than $500 million from investors, including Anthem, Philips, Allianz and Teva Pharmaceuticals, with the goal of connecting patients to healthcare providers remotely.

The company operates in all 50 United States and works with 55 health plans, which support over 36,000 employers and collectively represent more than 80 million covered lives, as well as 240 of the nation's largest health systems, encompassing more than 2,000 hospitals. In 2020, over 40,000 providers were using the Amwell Platform.

American Well was rebranded to Amwell on March 9, 2020.

In March 2023, Amwell added a cardiometabolic program to its offerings through its partnership with digital chronic condition management platform DarioHealth. With the partnership, Amwell patients can be referred to the program for chronic conditions like diabetes, high blood pressure and weight management.

In 2024, Axios wrote of the company that "strategic missteps and a lack of agility [have] pushed it toward an economic and operational nosedive". The article says that "The Schoenberg brothers became revenue-focused to the point of putting the company's care mission second ... That meant core components of its offering, such as clinical quality, started to become deprioritized".

== Founders ==
Amwell was set up by brothers Drs. Ido and Roy Schoenberg in 2006.

The brothers grew up in a village outside Jerusalem and both attended medical school in Israel. Roy completed his mandatory military service as a doctor, while Ido served in the military prior to his studies.

In 1996, Ido and his wife Phyllis Gotlib founded medical software maker iMDsoft. Roy founded healthcare management software firm CareKey and brought Ido on board as CEO. After selling CareKey to TriZetto Group in 2005, Ido and Roy decided to started working on Amwell, basing the company out of Boston.

== Services and business model ==
The company offers 24-hour teleconference access to licensed and credentialed physicians. It sells its platform as a subscription service to healthcare providers to put their medical professionals online and helps clients white-label and embed telehealth within their existing healthcare offerings for their patients and members.

Amwell enables care delivery across the healthcare continuum – from primary care and urgent care to high acuity specialty consults and telepsychiatry.

The platform has compatibility with clients’ portals and provider workflows. Providers can launch telehealth directly from their native Electronic Health Records (EHRs) with integration to their payer eligibility and claims systems.

Providers, patients and members can access this care through a variety of platforms, including mobile, web, phone and proprietary kiosks and carts that support multi-way video, phone or secure messaging interactions.

The Amwell Medical Group is a nationwide physician owned and operated medical practice that provides telehealth care exclusively on Amwell platforms.

The Amwell app is the direct-to-consumer telehealth platform of Amwell. The app connects people with doctors over secure video, without the need for an appointment. In 2014, Amwell passed the 1 million downloads mark and was called the most popular telehealth app of the year by App Annie, a mobile analytics firm. In March 2015, Amwell earned the American Telemedicine Association's first Accreditation for online patient consults.

Amwell has an international presence through a partnership with Meuhedet, the third-largest health maintenance organization in Israel, which leverages the Amwell Platform.

== Funding and acquisitions ==
- In 2009, Amwell raised $10 million in a Series A round from unnamed investors.
- In 2012, this financing was expanded to a total of $37 million.
- In 2014, Amwell raised a further $81 million in a Series C round, initially planned for $25 million and oversubscribed. This was followed by a $5 million venture round in August 2015.
- In 2018, Amwell raised $291 million in June, and an additional $75m later in the same year after the company signed a strategic partnership with Royal Philips.
- In 2018, Amwell acquired acute care company Avizia in a stated bid to broaden its business model and boost its ability to connect doctors in different hospitals for consults.
- In 2019, the company acquired Aligned Telehealth to expand its telepsychiatry offerings.
- In March 2020, American Well was rebranded to Amwell.
- In May 2020, Amwell raised $194 million in the midst of COVID-19 pandemic to help the company meet increased demand for telehealth.
- Less than a month after closing this raise, it was reported that Amwell confidentially filed for IPO.
- In August 2020, filed to go public with a Google investment of US$100 million in a concurrent private placement at the IPO price.
- In August 2021, Amwell acquired behavioral health company SilverCloud and chatbot technology company Conversa for US$320 million in total.

== Partnerships ==
- Apple: Amwell supported the Apple Heart Study conducted by Stanford University and published in the New England Journal of Medicine. The Apple Heart Study was the largest screening study on atrial fibrillation ever conducted, with over 400,000 consumers sharing Apple Watch heart rate data to detect atrial fibrillation which Amwell Medical Group physicians would follow up on and then refer patients to emergency care as needed.
- Cleveland Clinic: Amwell and the Cleveland Clinic launched a joint venture that connects patients and their local providers, both in the US and internationally, with Cleveland Clinic specialists.
- Cisco: Cisco is partnering with Amwell on a project to convert people's television sets into a virtual medical office.
- Cerner and Epic: Amwell has a strategic partnership with Cerner and Epic and other EHR providers, which allows Amwell's services to be accessed directly through EHR interfaces.
- Google Cloud: Amwell entered into a strategic partnership with Google Cloud to expand access to virtual care and improve patient and clinical experience.
- Philips: Developed a telehealth sleep program with Philips, allowing for the remote diagnosis and treatment of various common sleep disorders. Amwell also worked with Philips to embed the telehealth capabilities into the Philip's consumer-facing digital health platforms.
- TytoCare: Amwell's partnership with Israel-based medical device maker TytoCare powers an at home kit for patient-driven medical exams as part of a primary or urgent care visit.
