= IPulse =

iPulse
- Default view, high network load going in and out.
- Developer: The Iconfactory
- Stable release: 3.0 / October 7, 2015; 10 years ago
- Operating system: Mac OS X
- Type: process monitor
- Website: http://ipulseapp.com

iPulse is a visual system monitoring tool by The Iconfactory. It visualizes information about CPU, memory, network, battery and disk usage. Though iPulse uses vector graphics to draw most of its visualizations, it is currently limited to 128 pixels in size. The newest version has a monitor in the menu bar as well.

iPulse Jacket

The appearance of the window can be customized via an iPulse Jacket file. The file is actually a plist file containing the color settings for the various bars & graphs as well as the user specified background images.
