= John Suler =

Professor of Psychology

- Education: B.A. in psychology from the State University of New York at Stony Brook Ph.D. in Clinical Psychology Ph.D. in Clinical Psychology from the State University of New York at Buffalo
- Occupation: Professor
- Known for: written on the behavior of people online

John Suler is Professor of Psychology at Rider University who has written on the behavior of people online.

== Professional career ==
Suler earned a B.A. in psychology from the State University of New York at Stony Brook and his Ph.D. in Clinical Psychology from the State University of New York at Buffalo.

== See also ==
- Online disinhibition effect
