= Telepsychiatry =

Mental-health care by telecommunication

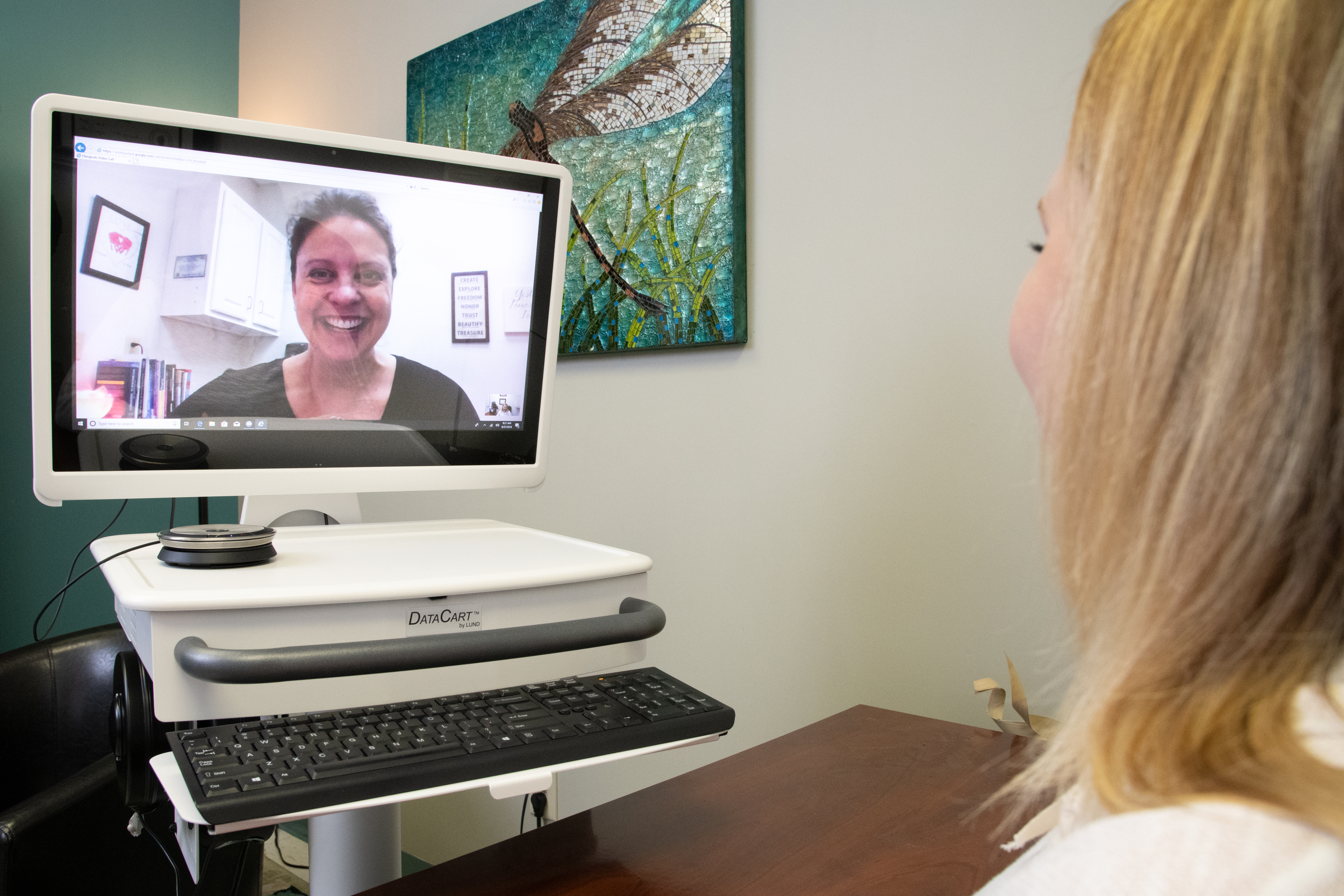
Telemental health session

Telepsychiatry or telemental health refers to the use of telecommunications technology (mostly videoconferencing and phone calls) to deliver psychiatric care remotely for people with mental health conditions. It is a branch of telemedicine.

Telepsychiatry can be effective in treating people with mental health conditions. In the short-term it can be as acceptable and effective as face-to-face care. Research also suggests comparable therapeutic factors, such as changes in problematic thinking or behaviour.

It can improve access to mental health services for some but might also represent a barrier for those lacking access to a suitable device, the internet or the necessary digital skills. Factors such as poverty that are associated with lack of internet access are also associated with greater risk of mental health problems, making digital exclusion an important problem of telemental health services.

During the COVID-19 pandemic mental health services were adapted to telemental health in high-income countries. It proved effective and acceptable for use in an emergency situation but there were concerns regarding its long-term implementation.

== Definition ==
Telepsychiatry or telemental health means the use of telecommunications (videoconferencing, voice call, text messages) to provide mental health services from a distance. This can include a wide range of services from different forms of traditional therapy (individual, group, family) to psychiatric evaluations and managing medications. Telemental health is a branch of telemedicine which is the process of using telecommunications technology to deliver medical services.

== Effectiveness ==
Telemental health services can be effective in improving symptoms and quality of life among people with mental health disorders. People who choose to receive services in this way, or for whom it would otherwise be difficult to receive care, tend to view these services positively as it improves their access to mental health care. Compared to face-to-face care, telemental health services delivered via video-call can be as acceptable and effective in the short term as the former, and are sometimes reported to result in lower rates of missed appointments.

Telepsychiatry is most successful when it is provided in a personalised and flexible way. Taking individual preferences into account regarding whether service users wish to receive care remotely, and if so whether by video or phone call results in a more acceptable and effective service. These preferences may change over time and vary from appointment to appointment, so revisiting them regularly is also necessary.

=== Benefits and limitations ===
Rural communities, people with physical disabilities may benefit from telemental health, as it reduces the need to travel (which can be difficult or costly in terms of time and money) and arrange and pay for child care. In regions with low population density, online groups can be easier to implement, as achieving minimally required group numbers seems more feasible.

For individuals with mental health problems which affect their ability and/or willingness to travel and meet clinicians face-to-face, telemental health can be an appropriate solution. It also offers a way to receive care for people reluctant to visit stigmatised places like those offering mental health care. Conversely, telemental health may exacerbate some mental health symptoms, such as paranoia and anxiety, and therefore may not be suitable for everyone.

Digital exclusion is a key concern for the use of telemental health. For already disadvantaged groups the widespread application of an online-first approach could exacerbate health inequalities. For example, mental health service users may lack access to an appropriate device or the internet. This may affect many groups of service users, including homeless people, people in inpatient wards, older adults, individuals with dementia, young children, people living in poverty, refugees, Travellers, among many others. Some people may also not have the ability, knowledge and confidence to use technology to connect online. Service users might also lack private space or find participating in sometimes intimate and distressing discussions from home intrusive. Other barriers include difficulty in establishing and maintaining therapeutic relationships and in conducting high-quality assessments. The user-friendliness of the digital platform is also an important factor in how inclusive a telemental health service is. When video calls are not acceptable or feasible phone calls or text messaging may be options but tend to result in more limited conversations and briefer interactions.

The use of video calls often results in a change in visual and auditory cues, which can be disruptive for service users (especially those engaging with mental health care for the first time) and staff. There are ways to improve the therapeutic quality when using telemental health, for example, setting up cameras at an appropriate angle and height, and using a high speed internet connection at both ends, to reduce the likelihood of video glitches or audio lags.

Providing mental health care via video calls is largely seen as beneficial among mental health staff, due to its ability to improve access to care and increase efficiency of services. When training, technical support, clear guidelines and a good digital infrastructure are available, clinicians can find telemental health useful and easy to engage with. However, when training and technical support is unavailable, it can represent a challenge and concern to staff. In addition, some mental health staff express concerns regarding safety, security, liability, and confidentiality when using video calls to provide mental health care.

Optimizing the implementation of telemental health can be achieved by using guidelines and strategies that are created together (co-produced) with service users and staff.

== Sub-specialties ==
Telepsychiatry includes a variety of sub-specialties based on different contexts of service delivery.

=== Home-based telepsychiatry ===
Psychiatric support of people who are at home or in another private setting is called home-based telepsychiatry or direct-to-consumer telepsychiatry, and it can be delivered with only a webcam and high-speed internet service. The growth in home-based telepsychiatry is attributed to a shortage of psychiatrists and the ability to reach people in rural areas. The telepsychiatrist, collaboratively with service users, needs to consider several factors before starting treatment. They must receive informed consent and guarantee that the use of telepsychiatry is safe for the patient, use secure videoconferencing platforms in order to protect the patient's privacy and provide the same standard of care as in a traditional office. Telepsychiatry produces similar treatment outcomes and has similar reliability of diagnosis compared to face-to-face therapy. Patient satisfaction with telepsychiatry is generally high, although providers report lower levels of satisfaction than patients. Despite a higher up-front cost, telepsychiatry is more cost-effective in the long run due to savings in travel expenses. At the same time patients may lack access to privacy in their homes to attend telepsychiatry appointments.

=== Forensic telepsychiatry ===
Forensic telepsychiatry is the use of a remote psychiatrist or nurse practitioner for psychiatry in a prison or correctional facility, including psychiatric assessment, medication consultation, suicide watch, pre-parole evaluations and more. Telepsychiatry can deliver significant cost savings to correctional facilities by eliminating the need for prisoners to be escorted to off-site appointments and psychiatric interventions.

=== On-demand telepsychiatry ===
As of 2008, guidelines are being developed for the provision of telepsychiatric consultation for emergency psychiatric patients, such as the evaluation of people who are distressed and feeling suicidal, depressed, manic, or experience psychosis, acute anxiety patients. However, emergency telepsychiatry services are already being provided to hospital emergency departments, jails, community mental health centers, substance abuse treatment facilities, and schools. Emergency telepsychiatry can ease staff shortages in overworked hospital emergency departments and increase the number of people with mental health conditions who can receive care. Rather than employ expensive, short-term locum tenens doctors or have emergency department physicians evaluate the psychiatric stability of their patients, hospitals can use telepsychiatry to decrease costs and increase patient access to behavioral health evaluations by psychiatric specialists.

Crisis telepsychiatry is also an efficient means of reducing the need for psychiatric boarding. Psychiatric boarding is when someone is detained, often in a hospital emergency department, while waiting for proper psychiatric treatment. With the increased throughput offered by telepsychiatry, psychiatric consumers enjoy reduced wait times and faster access to care.

=== Scheduled telepsychiatry ===
Many facilities that offer behavioral health care are turning to telepsychiatry providers to allow for an increased care capacity. With routine telepsychiatry, a consistent provider or small group of providers serve a regular caseload of service users in previously scheduled blocks of time. Remote providers can be consulted for medication management, treatment team meetings, supervision, or to offer traditional psychiatric assessment and consultations.

Having access to remote providers allows facilities, especially those in rural areas that struggle to recruit and maintain providers, access to a greater variety of speciality care to offer their service users. For example behavioural therapy is an effective treatment for tics in children but many can not access this service due to a lack of professionals. Offering an online, self-guided but therapist-supported intervention can be effective in reducing tics and could allow more people to receive care.

== Telepsychiatry around the world ==
=== In the United States ===
One of the drivers behind telepsychiatry's growth in the United States has been a national shortage of psychiatrists, particularly in specialty areas such as child and adolescent psychiatry. Telepsychiatry can allow fewer doctors to serve more patients by improving utilization of the psychiatrist's time. The most common means of insurance coverage for telehealth services among the United States is to incorporate coverage into the Medicare program. Reimbursement for Medicare-covered services must satisfy federal requirements of efficiency, economy and quality of care. Since 1999, Medicare and Medicaid reimbursement for all kinds of telehealth services have expanded, requirements of providers have been reduced, and grants have been given to support telehealth program adoption. For 2014, the Center for Medicare (CMS) services does cover telemedicine services, including telepsychiatry in many areas.

HIPAA (the Health Insurance Portability and Accountability Act) is a United States federal law that establishes security and privacy standards for electronic medical information exchange, including telemental health services. In order to comply with HIPAA guidelines, many providers develop their own specialized videoconferencing services, since common third-party consumer solutions do not include sufficient security and privacy safeguards. There are also a growing number of HIPAA-compliant technologies available for telepsychiatry.

According to a Kaiser Family Foundation and Epic Research database of electronic health records, 40% of mental health and substance abuse visits in the United States were conducted by telehealth in 2021 (as compared with only 5% of all other outpatient care visits and virtually no mental health and substance abuse visits being conducted by telehealth prior to the COVID-19 pandemic), while more than 150 million Americans lived in designated healthcare shortage areas for mental health professionals by the Health Resources and Services Administration in 2022.

Since the passage of the Infrastructure Investment and Jobs Act in November 2021, the telehealth industry in the United States has expanded due to its $65 billion appropriation for broadband internet access expansion, and online mental health start-up companies saw a $4.8 billion increase in investment in 2022 according to Rock Health.

Digital advertising spending by telehealth companies increased from approximately $10 million in 2020 to $100 million in 2021 (while $23 million in telehealth digital advertising was spent on TikTok alone from January to November 2022). In December 2022, The Wall Street Journal published an analysis it conducted in October and November of that year of telehealth digital advertisements that found that 20 companies ran more than 2,100 advertisements on Facebook and Instagram that described prescription drug benefits without citing risks (including for ketamine and testosterone), that promoted unapproved usages of drugs, or that featured testimonials without disclosing the speaker's relationship with the company, while 15 telehealth companies ran more than 1,800 other social media advertisements without prescription drug warnings or risks (including at least 800 that promoted controlled substances).

=== In India ===
India's large population and relatively small number of psychiatrists makes telepsychiatric service a good option for expanding access to mental health care. Telepsychiatry in India is still a young industry, but it is gradually growing, led by institutes such as the Post Graduate Institute of Medical Education and Research in Chandigarh and the Schizophrenia Research Foundation in Chennai.

=== In the UK ===
In the years before the COVID-19 pandemic the National Health Service (NHS) has been slow at implementing telepsychiatry.

During the pandemic, there was rapid utilisation of telemental health to maintain contact and provide some services to people with mental health problems. Technological initiatives have also helped to address social isolation, which worsened throughout the pandemic. There were large increases in remote consultations in NHS primary care, and national data reported that most contacts in NHS mental health settings were delivered remotely in 2020 particularly during the first UK lockdown (March to July 2020).

=== Global health ===
There is an increasing demand for telemental health services in low- and middle income countries. This is especially pronounced due to the lack of access to quality healthcare, underfunding and low awareness of mental health issues. In a global health context telemental health may offer access to high-quality mental health services for a wider range of people. At the same time there are concerns around data security and challenges regarding proper infrastructure, capacity, access and skills.

== Telemental health during the COVID-19 pandemic ==
Due to lockdowns or 'stay at home' orders at the start of the COVID-19 pandemic, mental health services in high-income countries were able to adapt existing service provision to telemental health care. Estimates suggest that between 48% and 100% of service users who were already receiving care at the start of the pandemic were able to continue their mental health care using remote methods. Some face-to-face appointments still took place if necessary.

During the pandemic telemental health care (mostly phone and video calls) was effective and viewed as acceptable by the majority of clinicians and service users for use in an emergency situation. However both groups had concerns regarding the longer term use of telemental health care. For example, clinicians identified concerns including difficulties with medication appointments, concerns around engaging and assessing new patients, and finding it harder to assess some physical indicators of mental health status remotely. Service users identified barriers including a lack of private space at home to access during their sessions or access to technology.

The rates of telemental health use seem to have declined as COVID-19 restrictions were loosened, indicating that face-to-face care might be preferable for some service users and clinicians.

== See also ==
- Global mental health
- Online counseling
- Social media therapy
- Telephone counseling
- Telepsychology
- Use of technology in treatment of mental disorders
