= Telephone counseling =

Psychological service over the telephone

- Other names: telephone-based therapy, telephone-delivered therapy, telephone therapy, telephone psychotherapy, telephone-administered psychotherapy, telephone-delivered psychological interventions

Telephone counseling (also known as telephone therapy, telephone-based or telephone-delivered psychological treatment) refers to the use of the telephone to deliver any type of psychological treatment or therapy (such as cognitive behavioral therapy) for mental health difficulties (like depression, anxiety). Telephone therapy can be as effective as traditional, face-to-face therapy. Along with online therapy, it is a type of telepsychology service. In telephone-based therapy, there is verbal communication, but no non-verbal communication which is present in video calls, for example.

== Effectiveness ==
Psychological treatment delivered through the telephone can be as effective for adults with depression or anxiety as face-to-face therapy. For adults with depression, telephone therapy can even be more effective than traditional therapy. For adults with anxiety, telephone-based treatment can be more effective than having to be on a waitlist before receiving treatment. For telephone therapy to remain effective and accepted, it is important for practitioners to continue professional development. This maintains the confidence in both individual and collective ability to deliver treatment over the telephone.

== Advantages ==
Compared to in-person therapy, telephone-delivered psychological treatment might offer significant advantages to some people. By removing the need for the practitioner and their client to be in the same space, telephone-delivered therapy improves flexibility of the sessions, and makes treatment more accessible for people unable to travel because of illness, financial or time constraints. By making treatment available in the privacy of one's own home, it also provides a degree of anonymity that is comforting to some people. This may reduce the concerns about the stigma that some people may feel relating to mental health and seeking treatment with a traditional in-person therapist.

== Disadvantages ==
In psychological treatment the therapeutic relationship (also called the therapeutic alliance) between practitioner and their patient is seen as a central mechanism of change and improvement in symptoms. Some practitioners have raised concerns that the use of telephone may hamper the quality of this relationship. However there seems to be no differences between telephone and face-to-face psychological treatment in the quality of the relationship formed and both are effective ways of delivering therapy.

== See also ==
- Telepsychiatry
- Online counselling
