= Brain Balance =

Brain training program company in America

- Founded: 2006; 20 years ago
- Founder: Robert Melillo
- Services: After-school learning centers

Brain Balance Achievement Centers are after-school learning centers that offer a program of brain training, exercise, simple physical exercises, skills training, and dietary advice that it says helps children with developmental and learning disabilities.

== History ==
The Brain Balance program was developed by Robert Melillo, a New York-based chiropractor. He began developing the business and its learning centers in 2006, opting for a franchising model. The first center opened in 2007. By early 2018 there were 110 centers in the chain and the business had an annual revenue of $41 million.

As of 2018 there was no good evidence that the company's program helps children. In the scientific and medical community, Brain Balance has been criticized for the lack of scientific evidence for its marketing, as well as its claims about neuroplasticity and other aspects of brain development. That assessment is consistent with a 2015 determination by the Wisconsin Department of Health Services that there was insufficient evidence of effectiveness for the company's claims. The results of a June 2018 year-long investigation by National Public Radio cast further doubt on the veracity of claims by the company.

As of 2024, Brain Balance is an approved provider through the Wisconsin Department of Health Services' Children's Long-Term Support (CLTS) Program, a Medicaid waiver initiative that funds services for children with disabilities.
