= Social media therapy =

Social media therapy is a form of expressive therapy. It uses the act of creating and sharing user-generated content as a way of connecting with and understanding people. Social media therapy combines different expressive therapy aspects of talk therapy, art therapy, writing therapy, and drama therapy and applies them to the web domain. Within social media therapy, synchronous or asynchronous dialogue occurs through exchanges of audio, text or visual information. The digital content is published online to serve as a form of therapy.

== Background ==
Time spent online via email, websites, instant messaging and social media has increased: since 1999, more than 2,554 million people have become internet users. This alters the way people communicate with each other, and alters the connotation of certain words. The concepts of "identity", "friend", "like" and "connected" have adapted alongside technology. People are influenced by data sharing, social marketing, and technological tools.

There are multiple therapeutic services offered through the internet. E-therapy, online counseling, cyber therapy, and social media therapy are similar in that each utilizes the internet in order to provide therapy for patients.

== Controversy ==
There are pros and cons when it comes to the subject of online therapy. Criticism of providing therapy through online methods comes from concerns over the lack of physical contact. There are important features of therapy created through face-to-face therapy such as transference and countertransference that can not be created through online therapy. Patricia R. Recupero and Samara E. Rainey stated in their article "Informed Consent to E-Therapy" of American Journal of Psychotherapy that the lack of face-to-face interaction increased the risk of misdiagnosis and misunderstanding between the E-therapist and patient, thereby increasing the risk of uncertainty for the clinician. There are also concerns over the internet creating a distraction from the therapy itself. Confidentiality and privacy concerns have been raised as well. However, several systematic reviews have found that online psychotherapy can produce clinical outcomes comparable to face-to-face treatment, suggesting that physical distance does not inherently reduce therapeutic effectiveness.

== See also ==
- Social media
- Social therapy
- Therapy
