= Taric =

Taric or TARIC may refer to:

- Taric, a champion in League of Legends
- Tarif Intégré de l'Union Européenne or Common Customs Tariff (European Union)
  - TARIC code, rules for importing goods into the European Union
- Toronto and Region Islamic Congregation (TARIC), an Islamic Center commonly in Toronto, Ontario, Canada
- Alternative transliteration for Tariq (disambiguation)
