= Tariq (disambiguation) =

Tariq is an Arabic given name.

Tariq, Tarik or Taric may also refer to:

- Tariq (surname), a list of people with the surname Tariq or Tarique
- Tarik, a district in Sidoarjo Regency, Indonesia
- Tariq area, Greater Amman Municipality, Jordan
- Tariq-class destroyer, a class of guided missile destroyer warships of the Pakistan Navy
- Egyptian sloop Tariq
- Tariqa, a Sufi order and its way of life
- At-Tariq, a sura (chapter) of the Qur'an
- Al Tariq (magazine), political magazine in Beirut, Lebanon, between 1941 and 1945
- Tarik (album) a 1969 album by American jazz saxophonist Dewey Redman
- Jabal Tariq, or Rock of Gibraltar
- Pepsi Tarik, a soft drink that combines the taste of coffee and Pepsi cola
- Teh tarik, a type of tea served in Malaysia
- Toronto and Region Islamic Congregation (TARIC), an Islamic Center commonly in Toronto, Ontario, Canada
- Tariq, a fictional character portrayed by Mir Zayaan in the 2019 Indian film Notebook

== See also ==
- Taric (disambiguation)
