= Legality of cryptocurrency in Ukraine =

The legal regime of cryptocurrency is the regulation of the cryptocurrency market in Ukraine. In some countries, operations with cryptocurrency are officially allowed. It is usually treated as a commodity or an investment asset and is subject to relevant legislation for taxation.

== History ==
In November 2014, the National Bank of Ukraine made a statement about the legal regime of bitcoins in the country. It noted that the use of bitcoins is associated with increased risks due to the anonymity and decentralized nature of operations. This area is attractive for illegal activities, including laundering money obtained by criminal means or for financing terrorism. On the territory of Ukraine, the only legal monetary unit is the hryvnia, the issuance and circulation of other monetary units as a means of payment, as well as the use of monetary surrogates, is prohibited.

According to the NBU statement, bitcoin is “a money surrogate that cannot be used by individuals and legal entities on the territory of Ukraine as a means of payment since this is contrary to the norms of Ukrainian legislation.” This was confirmed by the words of Bogdan Danylyshyn, chairman of the Board of the National Bank of Ukraine, in March 2017. Danylyshyn noted that the National Bank of Ukraine is studying the experience of introducing innovative products in the payment market and monitoring the policies of central banks and government agencies of other countries to resolve issues of virtual currencies.

On October 10, 2017, a draft law was registered in Verkhovna Rada, according to which the cryptocurrency is proposed to be recognized as a program code that is an object of property rights. The bill also provides for the taxation of cryptocurrencies, the procedure for taxing mining operations, and the exchange of cryptocurrencies is regulated by the current legislation of Ukraine. The draft law provides for the free exchange of cryptocurrency for other values, services or goods.

On September 8, 2021, Verkhovna Rada legalized virtual assets, which allowed the owners of virtual assets to legally exchange and declare them. The law should also allow foreign crypto companies to register blockchain businesses in Ukraine.

In June 2025, the Verkhovna Rada registered Draft Bill No. 13356, which, if adopted, would authorize the National Bank of Ukraine to acquire, hold and sell virtual assets — including cryptocurrencies — as part of a national reserve alongside gold and foreign currency. Subsequently, in September 2025 the Rada approved Bill No. 10225-d in its first reading, introducing a comprehensive regulatory framework for virtual asset service providers (VASPs) and establishing tax rules: profits from virtual asset transactions would be subject to 18 % personal income tax and an additional 5 % military levy for conversions into fiat during the first year, while virtual‐to‐virtual exchanges and certain low-value transactions are exempt. Under the proposed law, virtual assets are classified into three categories (asset-backed tokens, e-money tokens and other virtual assets) and providers must register with tax authorities, implement KYC/AML controls and report annual VASPs operations.

== See also ==
- Legality of cryptocurrency by country or territory
- Economy of Ukraine
