= Mark Okerstrom =

President and COO of Convoy, former president of the Expedia Group

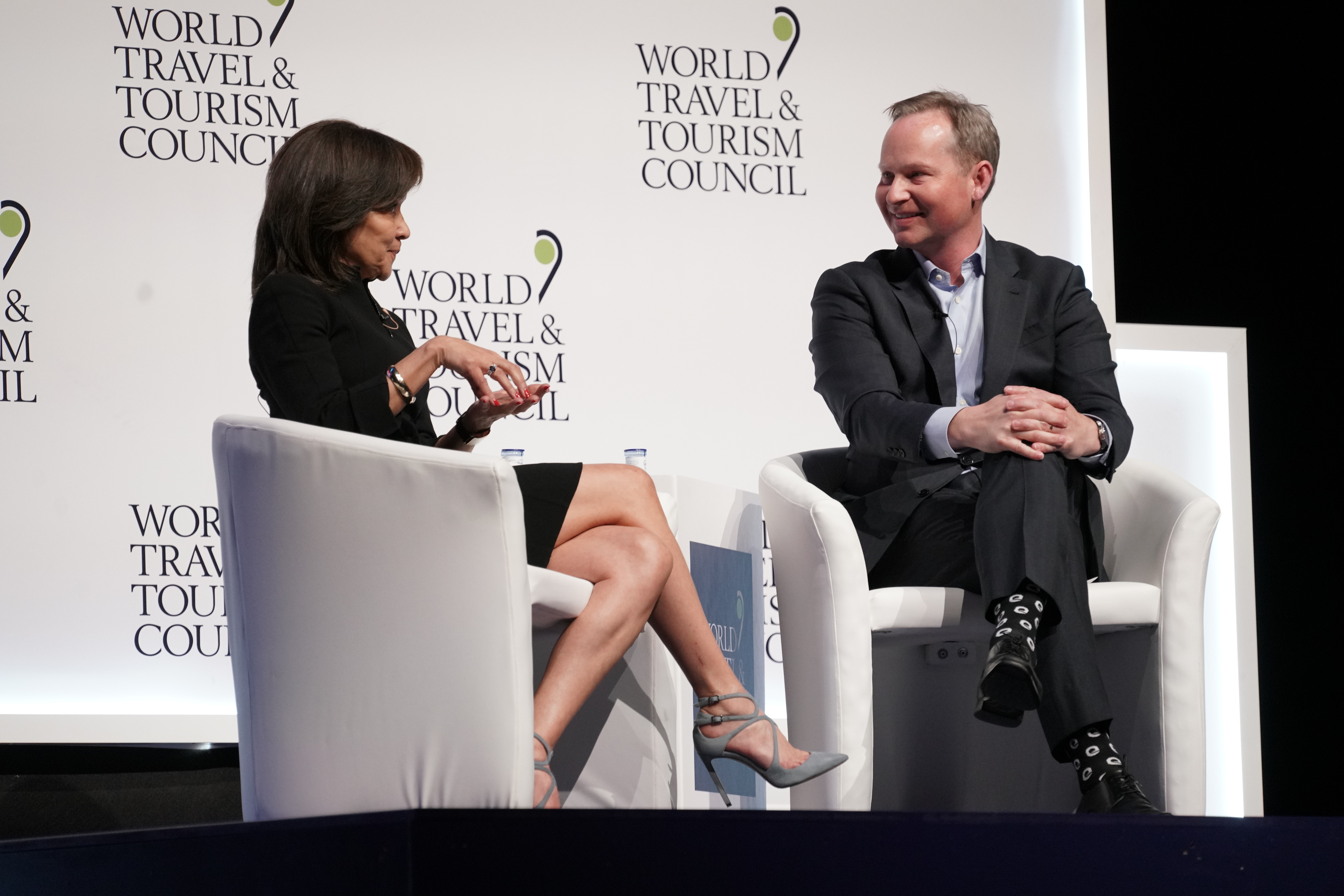
- Born: 1972 or 1973 (age 52–53); Vancouver, British Columbia, Canada
- Education: Simon Fraser University (1995); UBC Law School (1998; JD); Harvard Business Sch. (2004; MBA)
- Occupations: Lawyer, technology executive
- Known for: Former President/CEO Expedia Group
- Title: President/COO Convoy

Mark Okerstrom (born 1972/1973) is a Canadian lawyer and technology executive in the hospitality sector. He was the president and CEO of Expedia Group until December 4, 2019 when he resigned over disagreements on strategy with Barry Diller and the Expedia board. Mark then joined as president and COO of Convoy until the company ceased core operations and was sold to Flexport.

== Early life and education ==
Okerstrom was born in Vancouver, British Columbia, and is the son of two school teachers.

Okerstrom earned a certificate of liberal arts from Simon Fraser University in 1995, a Juris Doctor from the University of British Columbia in 1998, and a Master of Business Administration from Harvard Business School in 2004.

== Career ==
In his early career, Okerstrom was an associate at the law firms Fasken Martineau and Freshfields Bruckhaus Deringer from 1998 to 2002. In 2003, he became an associate at investment bank UBS in London. Okerstrom later became a consultant at Bain & Company in Boston and San Francisco from 2004 to 2006, handling mergers and acquisitions. Okerstrom was recruited to join Expedia Inc. in 2006 as head of Expedia's corporate development and strategy group. He then became Expedia's chief financial officer in 2011 and later served also as executive vice president of operations, and served as the main negotiator in the company's investment stake in Trivago, and led the company's acquisitions of Travelocity and Wotif.

In August 2017, Okerstrom became CEO of Expedia, succeeding Dara Khosrowshahi. He also served on the organisation's board of directors. Okerstrom led the rebrand of Expedia, Inc. to Expedia Group in 2018.

According to the New York Times, Okerstrom was 23rd on the list of the highest paid CEOs of companies with revenues of at least $1 billion for 2017.

On December 4, 2019, Okerstrom and his CFO Alan Pickerill abruptly resigned from their respective roles at Expedia Group citing disagreements between the board and executives.

On August 27, 2020, Mark joined Seattle-based digital freight startup Convoy as President, COO.

== Personal life ==
Okerstrom is married and has two daughters.
