= Harmonized Tariff Schedule of the United States =

United States determination of tariffs

The Harmonized Tariff Schedule of the United States (HTSUS), also referred to as the Harmonized Tariff Schedule of the United States Annotated (HTSA), is the primary resource for determining tariff (customs duties) classifications for goods imported into the United States. It can also be used in place of Schedule B for classifying goods exported from the United States to foreign countries. The Harmonized Tariff Schedule classifies a good based on its name, use, and/or the material used in its construction and assigns it a ten-digit classification code number, and there are over 17,000 unique classification code numbers. Although the U.S. International Trade Commission publishes and maintains the Schedule in its various forms, U.S. Customs and Border Protection is the only agency that can provide legally binding advice or rulings on classification of imports.

The Schedule is based on the international Harmonized System, the global system of nomenclature that is used to describe most world trade in goods, maintained by the World Customs Organization (WCO). Virtually all countries base their tariff schedules on the WCO's Harmonized System; for example the Combined Nomenclature system is the basis for the tariff schedule of the European Union.

== History ==
The HTS was enacted by subtitle B of title I of the Omnibus Trade and Competitiveness Act of 1988, and became effective on January 1, 1989, replacing the previous Tariff Schedules of the United States (TSUS). The United States had not adopted the previous international nomenclatures, but signed on as a member to the World Customs Organization, which created the Customs Cooperation Council (CCC) and the U.S. Customs Service—predecessor to U.S. Customs and Border Protection of the U.S. Department of Homeland Security). Such organizations helped develop the HTS throughout the 1970s.

In 1981, President Ronald Reagan requested that the U.S. International Trade Commission prepare a draft of the U.S. tariff schedules using HTS nomenclature. This conversion was issued in June 1983, and after lengthy review from interested parties, replaced the TSUS on August 23, 1988 with the enactment of the Omnibus Trade and Competitiveness Act.

== Chapters ==
The tariff schedule has 99 chapters under 22 sections, and various appendices for chemicals, pharmaceuticals, and intermediate chemicals for dye. Raw materials or basic substances generally appear in the early chapters and in earlier headings within a chapter, whereas highly processed goods and manufactured articles appear in later chapters and headings. For example, Section I and Section II cover animals and plants, while Sections XVI, XVII, and XVIII cover "Machinery and Mechanical Appliances", "Vehicles, Aircraft, and Vessels", and "Precision Instruments, Clocks and Watches, and Musical Instruments".

== Online tools ==
The United States International Trade Commission (USITC) maintains the official online Harmonized Tariff Schedule (HTS) database, providing current tariff classifications, duty rates, and special provisions. The database is updated to reflect modifications issued through Presidential Proclamations and Federal Register notices.

U.S. Customs and Border Protection (CBP) offers the Customs Rulings Online Search System (CROSS), which provides access to binding rulings and classification determinations dating back to 1989. Various HTS lookup tools help importers search for accurate codes and avoid misclassifications that could result in penalties or delays. The USITC's DataWeb provides historical import and export statistics organized by HTS codes, enabling trade analysis and tariff research.

== Notable HS4 codes ==
Selected HS4 (4-digit Harmonized System) headings are often used for sector-level trade analysis within the broader HTSUS framework. The following table lists notable headings across energy, chemicals, pharmaceuticals, machinery, electrical equipment, and transportation equipment.

HS4 code	Brief description
2701	Coal and coal-based solid fuels
2702	Lignite
2703	Peat
2704	Coke, semicoke, and retort carbon
2705	Coal gas, water gas, and similar manufactured gases
2706	Mineral tars
2707	Coal-tar distillation oils and related products
2708	Pitch and pitch coke from tar
2709	Crude petroleum oils
2710	Refined petroleum oils and related oil products
2711	Petroleum gases and other gaseous hydrocarbons
2712	Petroleum jelly, paraffin waxes, and related mineral waxes
2713	Petroleum coke, bitumen, and petroleum residues
2714	Natural bitumen, asphalt, oil shale, and tar sands
2715	Bituminous mixtures
2716	Electrical energy
2901	Acyclic hydrocarbons
2902	Cyclic hydrocarbons
2903	Halogenated hydrocarbon derivatives
2904	Sulfonated, nitrated, or nitrosated hydrocarbon derivatives
2905	Acyclic alcohols and related derivatives
2906	Cyclic alcohols and related derivatives
2907	Phenols; Phenol-Alcohols
2908	Derivatives of phenols and phenol-alcohols
2909	Ethers, ether-alcohols, peroxide compounds, and related derivatives
2910	Epoxides and related epoxide derivatives
2911	Acetals, hemiacetals, and related derivatives
2912	Aldehydes and paraformaldehyde
2913	Derivatives of aldehyde-function compounds
2914	Ketones, quinones, and related derivatives
2915	Saturated acyclic monocarboxylic acids and derivatives
2916	Unsaturated or cyclic monocarboxylic acids and derivatives
2917	Polycarboxylic acids and derivatives
2918	Carboxylic acids with added oxygen function and derivatives
2919	Phosphoric esters and related salts or derivatives
2920	Esters of inorganic non-metal acids and related salts
2921	Amine-function compounds
2922	Oxygen-function amino-compounds
2923	Quaternary ammonium salts, hydroxides, and phosphoaminolipids
2924	Carboxyamide compounds and carbonic acid amides
2925	Carboxyimide and imine-function compounds
2926	Nitrile-function compounds
2927	Diazo, azo, and azoxy compounds
2928	Organic hydrazine and hydroxylamine derivatives
2929	Other nitrogen-function organic compounds
2930	Organo-sulfur compounds
2931	Organo-inorganic compounds
2932	Oxygen-containing heterocyclic compounds
2933	Nitrogen-containing heterocyclic compounds
2934	Nucleic acids, salts, and other heterocyclic compounds
2935	Sulfonamides
2936	Provitamins, vitamins, and related derivatives
2937	Hormones, steroid derivatives, and related compounds
2938	Glycosides and their derivatives
2939	Alkaloids and their derivatives
2940	Chemically pure sugars other than common bulk sugars, plus derivatives
2941	Antibiotics
2942	Other organic compounds not elsewhere specified
3001	Glands, organs, extracts, heparin, and related therapeutic substances
3002	Blood products, antisera, vaccines, toxins, and microbial cultures
3003	Mixed medicaments not in dosage form
3004	Medicaments in dosage or retail form
3005	Medicated bandages and similar articles
3006	Other specified pharmaceutical goods
8401	Nuclear reactors, fuel elements, and isotopic-separation equipment
8402	Steam and vapor-generating boilers
8403	Central heating boilers
8404	Auxiliary boiler plant and condensers
8405	Gas generators and related apparatus
8406	Steam and vapor turbines
8407	Spark-ignition internal combustion engines
8408	Compression-ignition internal combustion engines
8409	Parts for internal combustion engines of headings 8407 and 8408
8410	Hydraulic turbines, water wheels, and regulators
8411	Turbojets, turbopropellers, gas turbines, and parts
8412	Other engines and motors
8413	Liquid pumps and liquid elevators
8414	Air or vacuum pumps, compressors, fans, and ventilating hoods
8415	Air-conditioning equipment
8416	Furnace burners, stokers, and similar appliances
8417	Industrial and laboratory furnaces and ovens
8418	Refrigeration and freezing equipment; heat pumps
8419	Temperature-treatment machinery and equipment
8420	Calendering and other rolling machines
8421	Centrifuges and filtering or purifying machinery
8422	Dishwashing, filling, closing, cleaning, and packing machines
8423	Weighing machinery
8424	Spraying, dispersing, blasting, and fire-extinguishing apparatus
8425	Hoists, winches, capstans, and jacks
8426	Derricks, cranes, lifting frames, and straddle carriers
8427	Fork-lift trucks and similar handling vehicles
8428	Lifting, handling, loading, and unloading machinery
8429	Bulldozers, graders, excavators, loaders, tamping machines, and rollers
8430	Earth-moving, boring, piling, and snow-clearing machinery
8431	Parts for machinery of headings 8425 to 8430
8432	Soil-preparation and cultivation machinery
8433	Harvesting, threshing, mowing, and produce-sorting machinery
8434	Milking and dairy machinery
8435	Machinery for wine, cider, and juice production
8436	Other agricultural, horticultural, forestry, poultry, and beekeeping machinery
8437	Seed, grain, and cereal cleaning, sorting, and milling machinery
8438	Machinery for industrial food and drink preparation
8439	Pulp- and paper-making machinery
8440	Bookbinding machinery
8441	Other paper-pulp, paper, and paperboard machinery
8442	Typesetting and printing-component preparation machinery
8443	Printing machinery and related equipment
8444	Machines for extruding, drawing, texturing, or cutting man-made textile materials
8445	Textile fiber preparation and yarn-production machinery
8446	Weaving machines
8447	Knitting, stitch-bonding, lace, embroidery, braid, net, and tufting machines
8448	Auxiliary textile machinery and accessories
8449	Felt and nonwoven manufacturing or finishing machinery
8450	Household and laundry washing machines
8451	Textile washing, cleaning, pressing, and related machinery
8452	Sewing machines and related parts
8453	Leather, hide, skin, and footwear-working machinery
8454	Metallurgical converters, ladles, molds, and casting machinery
8455	Metal-rolling mills and rolls
8456	Machine tools using laser, ultrasonic, electro-discharge, or water-jet processes
8457	Machining centers and transfer machines
8458	Metal-removing lathes and turning centers
8459	Metal-removing drilling, boring, milling, threading, and tapping machine tools
8460	Grinding, honing, deburring, and polishing machine tools
8461	Planing, shaping, broaching, and related metal-working machine tools
8462	Forging, bending, folding, shearing, and pressing machine tools
8463	Metal-working machine tools not removing material
8464	Machine tools for stone, ceramics, concrete, asbestos-cement, and glass
8465	Machine tools for wood, cork, bone, rubber, plastics, and similar hard materials
8466	Parts and accessories for machine tools of headings 8456 to 8465
8467	Hand tools with pneumatic, hydraulic, electric, or non-electric motors
8468	Soldering, brazing, and welding machinery and apparatus
8469	Typewriters and word-processing machines
8470	Calculating machines, cash registers, and similar office devices
8471	Automatic data processing machines and units
8472	Other office machines
8473	Parts and accessories for office machines of headings 8469 to 8472
8474	Mineral sorting, grinding, mixing, agglomerating, and molding machinery
8475	Machinery for lamp assembly and glass-working
8476	Automatic vending machines
8477	Rubber- and plastics-working machinery
8478	Tobacco-processing machinery
8479	Other machinery and mechanical appliances with individual functions
8480	Molding boxes, mold bases, patterns, and molds
8481	Taps, cocks, valves, and similar appliances
8482	Ball and roller bearings
8483	Shafts, cranks, bearings, gears, clutches, and transmission elements
8484	Gaskets, seals, and similar joints
8485	Other non-electrical machinery parts
8486	Semiconductor-manufacturing machinery and apparatus
8487	Other machinery parts not elsewhere specified
8501	Electric motors and generators
8502	Electric generating sets and rotary converters
8503	Parts for motors, generators, and generating sets
8504	Transformers, static converters, inductors, and parts
8505	Electromagnets, permanent magnets, and related devices
8506	Primary cells and batteries
8507	Electric storage batteries
8508	Vacuum cleaners
8509	Domestic electromechanical appliances with self-contained motor
8510	Electric shavers, clippers, and hair-removal appliances
8511	Ignition and starting equipment for internal combustion engines
8512	Electrical lighting and signaling equipment for vehicles and cycles
8513	Portable electric lamps with own power source
8514	Industrial and laboratory electric furnaces and ovens
8515	Electric soldering, welding, and hot-spraying apparatus
8516	Electric water heaters, space heaters, and other electrothermic appliances
8517	Telephone, telegraph, and related communication apparatus
8518	Microphones, speakers, headphones, amplifiers, and related audio equipment
8519	Sound-reproducing apparatus
8520	Sound-recording apparatus
8521	Video recording or reproducing apparatus
8522	Parts and accessories for certain sound and video apparatus
8523	Unrecorded media for sound or data recording
8524	Recorded media for sound or similar phenomena
8525	Transmission apparatus, television cameras, and digital cameras
8526	Radar, radio navigation, and radio remote-control apparatus
8527	Radio reception apparatus
8528	Television receivers, monitors, and projectors
8529	Parts for certain radio, television, and radar apparatus
8530	Electrical signaling, safety, and traffic-control equipment
8531	Electric sound or visual signaling apparatus
8532	Electrical capacitors
8533	Electrical resistors other than heating resistors
8534	Printed circuits
8535	High-voltage electrical switching and circuit-protection apparatus
8536	Low-voltage electrical switching and circuit-protection apparatus
8537	Boards, panels, consoles, and similar control or distribution apparatus
8538	Parts for apparatus of headings 8535 to 8537
8539	Electric filament, discharge, ultraviolet, and infrared lamps
8540	Thermionic, cold-cathode, and photocathode tubes
8541	Diodes, transistors, semiconductor devices, LEDs, and related parts
8542	Electronic integrated circuits and microassemblies
8543	Other electrical machines and apparatus with individual functions
8544	Insulated wire, cable, conductors, and optical fiber cable
8545	Carbon electrodes, brushes, and related electrical carbon articles
8546	Electrical insulators
8547	Insulating fittings for electrical machines and equipment
8548	Battery waste, spent cells, and other electrical parts not elsewhere specified
8549	Electrical and electronic waste and scrap
8701	Tractors
8702	Motor vehicles for transporting ten or more persons
8703	Passenger motor cars and similar vehicles
8704	Motor vehicles for transporting goods
8705	Special-purpose motor vehicles
8706	Chassis fitted with engines for certain motor vehicles
8707	Vehicle bodies, including cabs
8708	Parts and accessories for motor vehicles of headings 8701 to 8705
8709	Works trucks and similar self-propelled industrial vehicles
8710	Tanks and armored fighting vehicles
8711	Motorcycles, mopeds, and cycles with auxiliary motors
8712	Bicycles and other non-motorized cycles
8713	Carriages for disabled persons
8714	Parts and accessories for motorcycles, bicycles, and similar cycles
8715	Baby carriages and strollers
8716	Trailers, semi-trailers, and other non-mechanically propelled vehicles

== See also ==
- Harmonized Commodity Description and Coding System
- U.S. Customs and Border Protection
- United States International Trade Commission
