= Common external tariff =

Aspect of a customs union

A common external tariff (CET) must be introduced when a group of countries forms a customs union. The same customs duties, import quotas, preferences or other non-tariff barriers to trade apply to all goods entering the area, regardless of which country within the area they are entering. It is designed to end re-exportation; but it may also inhibit imports from countries outside the customs union and thereby diminish consumer choice and support protectionism of industries based within the customs union. The common external tariff is a mild form of economic union but may lead to further types of economic integration. In addition to having the same customs duties, the countries may have other common trade policies, such as having the same quotas, preferences or other non-tariff trade regulations apply to all goods entering the area, regardless of which country, within the area, they are entering.

The main goal of the Custom Unions is to limit external influence, liberalize intra-regional trade, promote economic development and diversification in industrialization in the Community.

Examples of a common external tariff are those of the Mercosur countries (Brazil, Argentina, Venezuela, Paraguay and Uruguay), the Economic Community of West African States, the Common Customs Tariff of the Eurasian Economic Community customs union and the European Union Customs Union.

More broadly, customs administration involves the publication and application of import duty rates, product classification and valuation rules, rules of origin, and procedures for administering tariff quotas. The World Trade Organization's Agreement on Trade Facilitation requires its members to publish this information to improve transparency and help traders understand the customs requirements applicable to imported goods.

== Economic Community of West African States ==
The structure of the CET is related to the internalization of terms-of-trade effects in the Common External Tariff which has the following Structure as adopted by the ECOWAS Council of Ministers at its 70th ordinary session in June 2013 is as follows

Category	Type of Goods	Duty Rate
0	Basic Social Goods	0%
1	Basic Goods, Raw Goods, Capital Goods	5%
2	Inputs and Semi-Finished Goods	10%
3	Finished Goods	20%
4	Specific Goods for Economic Development	35%

The goods declared to Customs in the Community, must generally be classified according to the CET. Imported and exported goods must be declared stating under type they fall. This determines which rate of customs duty applies and how the goods are treated for statistical purposes.

=== Benefits of the CET ===
- Increasing the Intra-regional trade: guarantying the availability of more goods to be traded regionally.
- Prevention of trade diversion
- The CET would provide durability in trade: traders would be able to make plans with the confidence that the tariff is constant. Policies affecting import tariffs can no longer be changed arbitrarily. This will ensure the attraction of more foreign direct investments.
- The enlargement of domestic market resulting a rise on turnover: this will lead the region to become a single market for imported goods.
- Increase in economies of scale resulting in the enlargement of internal industries.
- Increased production and productivity: with a large market to satisfy, production opportunities would increase.
- Casting down smuggling: smuggling is often encouraged by the difference in tariffs, but when a region applies a common tariff, this will remove the necessity of buying smuggled products in regions which previously had high tariffs of the same goods.

=== Costs of regional integration ===
- Having a single market ensures a competitive environment for both consumers and markets which make monopolies existence hard. Among the consequences of these unique markets is that ineffective companies market share will decrease and it may have to close down.
- Some sectors of the national economy may undergo of negative impact due to an increase on international competitiveness, which the main reason is the transition to single markets, specially companies that used to benefit of national market protection may have a hard time to deal against their more efficient peers. Eventually, if the enterprise go wrong on organizing their methods, it will fail.

== See also ==
- Customs
- Harmonized System (World Customs Organisation)
- Combined Nomenclature (EU)
