= List of European Union regulations =

This is a partial list of notable European Union Regulations.

== Regulations of the European Parliament and of the Council ==
=== 1969 ===
- Regulation 543/69 of the Council on the harmonization of certain social legislation relating to road transport. This was amended by Regulation No 2827/77.

=== 1987 ===
- Council Regulation (EEC) No 2658/87 of 23 July 1987 created the goods nomenclature called the Combined Nomenclature (CN), established to meet the requirements of both the Common Customs Tariff and the external trade statistics of the European Union.

=== 1994 ===
- Council Regulation (EC) No 1164/94 of 16 May 1994 establishing a Cohesion Fund.

=== 1995 ===
- Trade Barriers Regulation (TBR). Any EU company or group of companies can use the TBR to complain to the European Commission about obstacles to trade in third countries e.g. import bans, or about foreign trade practices which cause business problems within the European market, e.g. foreign subsidies. Investigations may result in several possible actions including reaching a settlement with the third country concerned or raising a case with the Dispute Settlement Body (DSB) of the World Trade Organization (WTO).

=== 1996 ===
- Council Regulation (EC) No 2271/96 protecting against the effects of the extra-territorial application of legislation adopted by a third country, and actions based thereon or resulting therefrom.

=== 1998 ===
- Council Regulation 1638/98 made changes to the organisation of the olive oil market in the EU. See Unión de Pequeños Agricultores
- Council Regulation (EC) 2679/98 of 7 December 1998, on the functioning of the internal market in relation to the free movement of goods among the Member States, was aimed at preventing obstacles to the free movement of goods attributable to "action or inaction" by a Member State. The regulation empowered the Commission to request intervention by a Member State when the actions of private individuals were creating an "obstacle" to free movement of goods. See also Commission v France (C-265/95).

=== 2001 ===
- Regulation 44/2001: assignment of jurisdiction and judicial cooperation in civil matters, replacing the 1968 Brussels Convention. Articles 59 and 60 of Regulation (EC) No 44/2001 deal with domicile for the purposes of cross-border EU litigation.

=== 2002 ===
- Regulation 178/2002 of 28 January 2002 laying down the general principles and requirements of food law, establishing the European Food Safety Authority (EFSA) and laying down procedures in matters of food safety. This regulation established the Rapid Alert System for Food and Feed (RASFF). Regulation 178/2002 allows the sale of foodstuffs containing living animals if they are "prepared for placing on the market for human consumption".

=== 2003 ===
- Regulation 1/2003 - Council Regulation (EC) No 1/2003 of 16 December 2002 on the implementation of the rules on competition laid down in Articles 81 and 82 of the Treaty (OJ L1, 4.1.03), the so-called "Modernisation Regulation". This regulation requires the designated national competition authorities of the Member States (NCAs) and the courts of the Member States to apply and enforce Articles 81 and 82 of the EC Treaty (Article 814 and Article 825 respectively) when national competition law is applied to agreements which may affect trade between Member States or to abuse prohibited by Article 82. It also established a 'legal exception' regime. These changes are often referred to as "modernisation".

=== 2004 ===
- Council Regulation 139/2004 establishing that the antitrust national authorities of EU member States have the competence to judge on undertakings whose economic and financial impact are limited to their respective internal markets.
- Regulation 261/2004, also known as the Flight Compensation Regulation - entitlements arising from a flight disruption.

=== 2005 ===
- Council Regulation 648/2005 of 13 April 2005, an amendment to Council Regulation (EEC) No 2913/92 establishing the Community Customs Code, introduced reference to risk and risk management in the role of the EU customs authorities, concerning risk for non-compliance with EU rules, revenue impact, or threats to security, safety, public health or the environment. This regulation provided a legal basis for the developing supply chain security risk management in the EU.

=== 2006 ===
- Regulation (EC) 1013/2006 on waste shipments. An agreement was reached between the European Parliament and the Council on a revision to this regulation on 17 November 2023, aiming to ban the export of plastic waste.

=== 2007 ===
- Regulation 861/2007 of 11 July 2007 established the European small claims procedure.

=== 2008 ===
- Regulation (EC) 294/2008 of 11 March 2008 establishing the European Institute of Innovation and Technology.
- The Modernised Customs Code (MCC) was adopted under Regulation (EC) 450/2008 of the European Parliament and of the Council of 23 April 2008 laying down the Community Customs Code (Modernised Customs Code). The MCC was primarily adopted to enable IT customs and trade solutions to be adopted.
- Regulation (EU) No 764/2008 laying down procedures relating to the application of certain national technical rules to products lawfully marketed in another Member State and repealing Decision No. 3052/95/EC. This regulation builds on the principle of mutual recognition and applies to products which are not covered by the harmonisation of legislation directed by the EU. See also the guidance documents for this regulation which are published by the European Commission. Decision No. 3052/95/EC was repealed with effect from 13 May 2009.
- Regulation (EU) No 765/2008 on conformity-assessment activity.

=== 2010 ===
- Regulation 995/2010 covers the legal obligations of "operators who place timber and timber products on the market". It is being replaced from 2023 by the Regulation on deforestation-free products.
- Regulation (EU) No 1095/2010 of the European Parliament and of the Council establishing the European Securities and Markets Authority.

=== 2011 ===
- Regulation 182/2011 governing use of the European Commission's implementing powers, also known as the Comitology Regulation.
- Regulation 305/2011, the Construction Products Regulation
- Regulation 1007/2011 on textile fibre names and related labelling and marking of fibre composition of textile products (the "Textile Regulation"). This regulation repealed Directives 73/44/EC, 96/73/EC and 2008/121/EC with effect from 8 May 2012.
- Regulation 1169/2011 on the provision of food information to consumers (FIC Regulation), subject to proposed revision.
- Regulation 1178/2011, adopted on 3 November 2011, provides for the regulation of aircrew working in civil aviation.

=== 2012 ===
- EU Succession Regulation (EU) No 650/2012, regarding wills and succession. It entered into force on 17 August 2012 and applied fully from 17 August 2015. Denmark, Ireland and the United Kingdom declined to opt into this regulation.
- Regulation (EU) No 1025/2012 of the European Parliament and of the Council of 25 October 2012 on European standardisation, amending Council Directives 89/686/EEC and 93/15/EEC and Directives 94/9/EC, 94/25/EC, 95/16/EC, 97/23/EC, 98/34/EC, 2004/22/EC, 2007/23/EC, 2009/23/EC and 2009/105/EC of the European Parliament and of the Council and repealing Council Decision 87/95/EEC and Decision No 1673/2006/EC of the European Parliament and of the Council.
- Regulation 1151/2012 on quality schemes for agricultural products and foodstuffs, includes provision for traditional speciality guaranteed (TSG) food labelling in Title III (articles 17-26).

=== 2013 ===
- Regulation 952/2013 of the European Parliament and of the Council, adopted on 9 October 2013, established the Union Customs Code.
- Regulation 1303/2013 of the European Parliament and of the Council of 17 December 2013 laying down common provisions on the European Regional Development Fund, the European Social Fund, the Cohesion Fund, the European Agricultural Fund for Rural Development and the European Maritime and Fisheries Fund and laying down general provisions on the European Regional Development Fund, the European Social Fund, the Cohesion Fund and the European Maritime and Fisheries Fund and repealing Council Regulation (EC) No 1083/2006, applicable to the period from 1 January 2014 to 31 December 2020 (see Article 26).
- Regulation 1308/2013 - Establishing a common organisation of the markets in agricultural products. The following regulations were repealed: Council Regulations (EEC) No 922/72, (EEC) No 234/79, (EC) No 1037/2001 and (EC) No 1234/2007.

=== 2014 ===
- Regulation (EU) 165/2014 of the European Parliament and of the Council on tachographs in road transport, issued on 4 February 2014, repealed Council Regulation (EEC) 3821/85 on recording equipment in road transport and amended Regulation (EC) 561/2006 of the European Parliament and of the Council on the harmonisation of certain social legislation relating to road transport, chiefly concerned with the specification for the so-called "smart" tachograph.

=== 2016 ===
- Audit Regulation 537/2014/EU - This regulation and the amended Audit Directive (2014/56/EU) both entered into force on 17 June 2016. The regulation established arrangements for cooperation between audit oversight bodies in the EU.
- General Data Protection Regulation 2016/679 - This regulation stipulates that everyone has the right to the protection of their own personal data . The regulation entered into force on 25 May 2018.

=== 2017 ===
- Regulation (EU) 2017/745 on the clinical investigation and sale of medical devices for human use.

=== 2018 ===
- Blocking Regulation, originally enacted as Council Regulation (EC) No 2271/96, passed to "provide[s] protection against and counteract[s] the effects of the extra-territorial application" of certain specified laws, all of them being United States federal legislation.

=== 2019 ===
- Regulation (EU) 2019/787 of the European Parliament and of the Council of 17 April 2019 on the definition, description, presentation and labelling of spirit drinks, the use of the names of spirit drinks in the presentation and labelling of other foodstuffs, the protection of geographical indications for spirit drinks, the use of ethyl alcohol and distillates of agricultural origin in alcoholic beverages, and repealing Regulation (EC) No 110/2008. This regulation noted that the repealed regulation (EC) No 110/2008 had "proved successful in regulating the spirit drinks sector", but "in the light of recent experience and technological innovation, market developments and evolving consumer expectations, it is necessary to update the rules on the definition, description, presentation and labelling of spirit drinks and to review the ways in which geographical indications for spirit drinks are registered and protected".
- Regulation (EU) 2019/1150 of the European Parliament and of the Council of 20 June 2019 on promoting fairness and transparency for business users of online intermediation services, concerned with commercial provision of services which "allow business users to offer goods or services to consumers, with a view to facilitating the initiating of direct transactions between those business users and consumers, irrespective of where those transactions are ultimately concluded".
- Regulation (EU) 2019/2088 of the European Parliament and of the Council of 27 November 2019 on sustainability‐related disclosures in the financial services sector, also referred to as the Sustainable Finance Disclosure Regulation (SFDR). This regulation was adopted in order to enhance transparency regarding the sustainability of financial products, and thereby to support the direction private investment funds towards sustainable investments.

=== 2022 ===
- Regulation (EU) 2022/858 of the European Parliament and of the Council of 30 May 2022 on a pilot regime for market infrastructures based on distributed ledger technology, and amending Regulations (EU) No 600/2014 and (EU) No 909/2014 and Directive 2014/65/EU.
- Regulation (EU) 2022/1031 of the European Parliament and of the Council of 23 June 2022 on the access of third-country economic operators, goods and services to the Union’s public procurement and concession markets and procedures supporting negotiations on access of Union economic operators, goods and services to the public procurement and concession markets of third countries (International Procurement Instrument – IPI). See Government procurement in the European Union#Third country access.

=== 2023 ===
- Regulation (EU) 2023/1525 of the European Parliament and of the Council of 20 July 2023: the Act in Support of Ammunition Production

=== 2024 ===
- Anti-Money Laundering Regulation (AMLR), which are related to Markets in Crypto-Assets:
  - 2024/1620, establishing the Anti-Money Laundering Authority.
  - 2024/1624, on the prevention of the use of the financial system for the purposes of money laundering or terrorist financing. For the first time in EU law, the regulation explicitly listed professional football clubs and football agents as obliged entities, bringing them inside the same regulatory perimeter as banks and payment institutions from 10 July 2029. In-scope clubs are required to conduct customer due diligence on investors, sponsors, football agents and transfer counterparties, screen for sanctions and politically exposed persons, analyse sources of wealth, and operate a board-approved anti-money laundering governance framework. Non-EU clubs engaging in cross-border transfers or commercial transactions with EU-based counterparties are also indirectly affected, as EU obliged entities must conduct due diligence on their international counterparties as part of their own compliance obligations.
  - 2024/1640, the 6th Anti-Money Laundering Directive, which must be implemented by July 2027. The requirements for a single access point to real estate information must be transposed by 10 July 2029.

== Implementing Regulations ==
Implementing Regulations aim to ensure the uniform implementation of European legislation. Their subject-matter is restricted to matters necessary for uniform implementation. An example is Commission Implementing Regulation (EU) No 668/2014, issued by the Commission on 13 June 2014, "laying down rules for the application of Regulation (EU) No 1151/2012 of the European Parliament and of the Council on quality schemes for agricultural products and foodstuffs".
