= Intrastat =

Intrastat is the system for collecting information and producing statistics on the trade in goods between countries of the European Union (EU). It began operation on 1 January 1993, when it replaced customs declarations as the source of trade statistics within the EU. The requirements of Intrastat are similar in all member states of the EU, although there are important exceptions.

== Motivation ==
Trade statistics are an essential part of a country's balance of payments account and are regarded as an important economic indicator of the performance of any country. Export data in particular can be used as an indicator of the state of a country's manufacturing industries as a whole. The statistics are used by government departments to help set overall trade policy and generate initiatives on new trade areas. The volume of goods moving is also assessed to allow the planning of future transport infrastructure needs. Intrastat is also being used as a tool against VAT fraud, permitting the comparison between Intrastat and VAT declarations, for example in the UK and in Italy (as suggested by rules governing Intrastat in that country).

The commercial world uses the statistics to assess markets within the country (e.g. to gauge how imports are penetrating the market) and externally (e.g. to establish new markets for their goods).

In addition, the statistics are passed on to European and International bodies such as Eurostat (the Statistical Office of the European Communities), the United Nations and the International Monetary Fund.

Intrastat data forms an integral part of these statistics and therefore it is important that the data submitted be of a high quality.

== Practicalities ==
Each member country establishes an annual threshold value below which a business is not required to file Intrastat forms. The reporting thresholds vary from country to country and, within one country, may be different for dispatches (exports) and arrivals (imports). For the eurozone countries excluding Italy, thresholds for 2013 average 316,000 and 422,000 euro for arrivals (imports) and dispatches (exports), respectively. As established by Regulation (EC) No 222/2009 of the European Parliament and of the Council of 11 March 2009, the current thresholds are designed to cover 97% of dispatches and 95% of arrivals. This regulation raised thresholds with the purpose of reducing the statistical and, hence, financial burden on small operators. According to an EU Memo of 2013, the increased thresholds reduced the number of reporting enterprises by one third and saved them 134 million euro.

Italy is the only EU country to set no thresholds, so all operators (excluding only new, young entrepreneurs in a facilitated tax regime) must file Intrastat forms.

For the Intrastat system, the customs authorities provide the national authorities with statistics on dispatches and arrivals of goods. Member states then transmit their data to Eurostat on a monthly basis, generally within 40 days. The national authorities collect the following data:

- the identification number allocated to the party responsible for providing information;
- the reference period;
- the flow (arrival, dispatch);
- the commodity;
- the value of the goods;
- the quantity of the goods;
- the partner Member State;
- the nature of the transaction.

Since 2010, Intrastat reporting also applies to services in both Italy and France. The collection of data on the intracommunity trade in services is not a part of the European Intrastat system, but is instead required by the EU VAT Directive. So, in these two countries, Intrastat forms replace EC Sales lists.

Specifically concerning the commodity codes according to the Combined Nomenclature (CN), it needs to be acknowledged that although the CN is revised annually and published as a Commission Regulation in the EU Official Journal in October of the preceding year, the Member States have the right to collect more detailed information such as a more detailed commodity code by adding another digit to the end of the EU level 8 digit CN code (Article 9(2) of regulation 638/2004).
