= ImportGenius =

American software and information company

Trade Data Services, Inc.
- Type: Private
- Industry: Trade data; Business intelligence; Supply Chain Management
- Founded: 2007; 19 years ago
- Founder: Michael Kanko; Ryan Petersen; David Petersen
- Headquarters: Scottsdale, Arizona
- Key people: Michael Kanko (Chief Executive Officer); Nickie Bonenfant (Chief Operating Officer)
- Number of employees: Greater than 40 (as of May 2023)
- Website: importgenius.com

ImportGenius (stylized as ImportGenius.com, sometimes incorrectly credited as Import Genius, and formally known as Trade Data Services, Inc.) is a Scottsdale, Arizona-based company that specializes in trade data. It was founded in 2007 by Michael Kanko, David Petersen, and Ryan Petersen.

The company organizes and maintains a database of hundreds of millions of shipping manifests and customs records from government agencies and private companies around the world. It currently covers 18 territories from North America, Latin America, Europe, and Asia. ImportGenius employs machine-learning tools to identify customs patterns, scan regulatory documents and translate languages.

The data provided by ImportGenius are sourced from U.S. Customs and Border Protection and similar agencies from other countries. US data are obtained through the Freedom of Information Act and is considered public record. Data from other countries and territories, on the other hand, are legally obtained proprietary data.

Subscribers of ImportGenius can search through their database to analyze import and export activities at a granular level, identifying the origin and destination, entities involved for individual shipments, and other essential details for every shipment.

== History ==
In May 2008, ImportGenius, through its analysis of electronic customs clearance data, identified that Apple and its logistics partners have imported 188 ocean containers of a product type that was never declared on shipping manifests before. This gave them an insight into Apple's launch of the iPhone 3G before it was officially revealed by Steve Jobs at the company's Worldwide Developers Conference (WWDC) in June 2008.

In October 2017, ImportGenius joined Panjiva, another trade data company, in a lawsuit against the U.S. Customs and Border Protection and the U.S. Department of Treasury filed at the Southern District of New York. They claimed that the CBP is in violation of Section 431 of the Smoot-Hawley Tariff Act of 1930 by not making public the manifests of aircraft entering the United States, which contain information about their cargo and origin. However, the district court and the appeals court ruled in favor of the government, finding that section 431 only applies to waterborne vessels and not aircraft.

In March 2023, ImportGenius data was cited by Politico in their report about China North Industries sending 1,000 CQ-A rifles to Russia between June and December 2022; and DJI sending 12 shipments of drone parts to Russia, routing the shipments through the United Arab Emirates. The trade research team at ImportGenius also Identified a number of Chinese companies exporting key components for body armor, such as high-density polyethylene, and aramid to NPP "KLASS", a supplier of body armor for the Russian Armed Forces.

In July 2023, ImportGenius shared data to Politico demonstrating that a Rostov-on-Don–based import company imported more than US$60 Million of potential dual-use equipment, including drones from DJI, ceramics, and helmets.
