= Standard International Trade Classification =

Standard International Trade Classification (SITC) is a classification of goods used to classify the exports and imports of a country to enable comparing different countries and years. The classification system is maintained by the United Nations. The SITC classification, is currently at revision four, which was promulgated in 2006.

The SITC is recommended only for analytical purposes – trade statistics are recommended to be collected and compiled in the Harmonized System instead.

The following excerpt was taken from the United Nations Statistics Division, international trade statistics branch:

"For compiling international trade statistics on all merchandise entering international trade, and to promote international comparability of international trade statistics. The commodity groupings of SITC reflect (a) the materials used in production, (b) the processing stage, (c) market practices and uses of the products, (d) the importance of the commodities in terms of world trade, and (e) technological changes."

== See also ==
- Broad Economic Categories
- Combined Nomenclature
