= Trade Data Monitor =

Publisher of international trade data

- Company type: Privately held company
- Industry: Import and export trade data
- Founded: 2017; 9 years ago
- Founder: C. Donald Brasher Jr.
- Headquarters: Charleston, South Carolina; Geneva, Switzerland
- Area served: Worldwide
- Key people: C. Donald Brasher Jr. (president); Brigitte Stringfield (executive vice president); Miguel Alomar Escandell (director of information technology systems); John W. Miller (chief economic analyst)
- Products: TDM trade statistics database, customized trade statistics reports
- Services: specialized training in trade statistics
- Number of employees: 21
- Website: tradedatamonitor.com

Trade Data Monitor (TDM) is a trade data company based in Charleston, SC and Geneva, Switzerland. It procures and aggregates monthly import and export statistics for over 110 countries using Harmonized System commodity codes, offers specialized training in trade statistics, and provides clients with a searchable database and built-to-order statistical reports.

Trade Data Monitor has been widely cited for international trade statistics. Organizations that have cited TDM include international organizations such as the World Trade Organization, the Food and Agriculture Organization of the United Nations, and the International Monetary Fund, and branches and publications of the United States government, such as the United States Department of Agriculture, the United States Department of Commerce, and the United States International Trade Commission. TDM has also been cited in published research, including in the journals ARE Update and Choices, and in California Agriculture, a book published by the University of California. It has also appeared in news media, now with increasing frequency as the economic impact of the China–United States trade war and the COVID-19 pandemic have drawn attention to changes in international trade. Recently, TDM has been cited by The Wall Street Journal and the Washington Post, among other news sources.

TDM was founded by C. Donald Brasher Jr., an internationally recognized specialist in trade data analysis who has advised more than 16 governments and has worked with the United States Department of Commerce, the International Business and Economic Research Corporation in Washington, DC, and the Center for International Technological Cooperation and Development at the American University. He has also been quoted by publications such as The Wall Street Journal, The New York Times, The Financial Times, and the Journal of Commerce.
