= Broad Economic Categories =

The Broad Economic Categories (BEC) is a three-digit classification, which groups transportable goods according to their main end use. It is most often used for the general economic analysis of international merchandise trade data. The BEC system is defined in terms of the Standard International Trade Classification system.

The original BEC was published in 1971, and revised in 1976, 1986 and most recently in 1988. The top level categories of the BEC are as follows:

- BEC-1: Food and beverages
- BEC-2: Industrial supplies not elsewhere specified
- BEC-3: Fuels and lubricants
- BEC-4: Capital goods (except transport equipment), and parts and accessories thereof
- BEC-5: Transport equipment and parts and accessories thereof
- BEC-6: Consumer goods not elsewhere specified
- BEC-7: Goods not elsewhere specified

In 2007 a fourth revision is under discussion, including a possible extension of the BEC to include tradable services.

== See also ==
- Harmonized System
- Standard International Trade Classification
