= Pindrop Security =

American information security company

Pindrop (Security)
- Formerly: Pindrop Security
- Industry: Information security
- Founded: 2011
- Founders: Vijay Balasubramaniyan, PhD; Mustaque Ahamad, PhD; Paul Judge, PhD
- Headquarters: 817 West Peachtree Street NW, Suite 770, Atlanta, Georgia, United States
- Area served: Global
- Key people: Vijay Balasubramaniyan (CEO, CTO); Paul Judge (Chairman)
- Brands: Phoneprint; Phoneypot; FDS
- Services: Phone anti-fraud and authentication technology
- Number of employees: 160 (2015)
- Website: www.pindrop.com

Pindrop Security is an American information security company that provides risk scoring for phone calls to detect fraud and authenticate callers. The company analyzes several different features of a phone call that helps identify the uniqueness of a device and attaches it to a caller.

Vijay Balasubramaniyan, a computer science graduate from India studying the traits of wanted versus unwanted phone calls, teamed with his thesis advisor Mustaque Ahamad to launch a VentureLab project called Telineage in September 2010.

In 2011, he and Paul Judge founded Pindrop as a voice security company that combats fraud by analyzing and assigning risk to phone calls.

The company obtained a license to the intellectual property from Georgia Tech Research Corporation, while VentureLab supported the company for a Phase I commercialization grant from the Georgia Research Alliance.

In 2012, Pindrop raised $1 million in funding from Andreessen Horowitz, other venture capital firms and several angel investors. In June 2013, the company closed a $11 million Series A investment round led by Andreessen Horowitz and Citi Ventures, and also including Felicis Ventures and Redpoint, using the funds to scale up engineering, operations, sales and marketing in the US, Canada and Europe. In February 2015, Pindrop raised $35 million in a Series B round led by Institutional Venture Partners.

Pindrop Security raised another $75 million in 2016. Google Capital led the Series C round, with participation from Andreessen Horowitz, GV and others, bringing the company's total funding to $122 million. It was a rare case of both Google Capital and Google Ventures (now GV) investing in the same startup.

== Services ==
A Pindrop Security report The State of Phone Fraud 2014-2015: a Global, Cross-Industry Threat found that 86 million calls per month in the U.S. are phone scams. It also found that 1 in 6 phone numbers calling a consumer is a robocaller and 2.5 percent of U.S. phones receive at least one robocall per week.

The "acoustic fingerprinting" technology integrates with companies internal systems and identifies people's voices, locations, and devices. This is added to a database for future reference and to help separate legitimate callers from scammers.

To create metadata, Pindrop Security analyzed millions of phone calls in telecom databases from around the world and used machine learning to turn that information into usable content. By analyzing both the audio of a call and the metadata it has about a caller, the phoneprint reveals whether the caller is using a cell, landline, or VoIP phone; where the call really is coming from; and whether the caller has been seen before. It looks for evidence of frequency filters and codec artifacts, for example, and analyzes the calls for packet loss and dropped frames. In packet loss, "pindrop"-sized bits of audio drop out, which is where the company's name came from.

Based on the analysis, the service generates a risk profile and a score for each call. Analyzing millions of samples from call centers, it can identify specific criminal groups. An example is a criminal group based in Nigeria nicknamed "West Africa One." According to Pindrop, the West Africa One has 12 members and Pindrop has assessed the skill levels of each of the 12 members.
