= CapitalG =

Independent growth fund under Alphabet Inc.

- Formerly: Google Capital (2013-2016)
- Type: Subsidiary
- Industry: Venture capital
- Founded: 2013; 13 years ago
- Headquarters: San Francisco, California, U.S.
- Parent: Google (2013–2015); Alphabet Inc. (2015–present)
- Website: capitalg.com

CapitalG Management Company LLC (formerly Google Capital) is the independent growth fund under Alphabet Inc. The fund invests in growth-stage technology companies. Alphabet is its sole limited partner and allocates capital through annual funds. CapitalG describes its mandate as financial return, distinct from Google's Corporate Development group, which makes acquisitions aligned with Google's products. In addition to capital investment, CapitalG's approach includes giving portfolio companies access to Google's people, knowledge, and culture to support the companies' growth and offer them guidance.

== History ==
The fund began operating in 2013 but was only officially unveiled on February 19, 2014. The firm operates out of the Ferry Building in San Francisco. Following the Alphabet restructuring, Google Capital was renamed CapitalG on November 4, 2016.

== Team ==
CapitalG is led by managing partner Laela Sturdy. It was founded in 2013 by David Lawee, formerly Google's Vice President of Corporate Development, and before that, Google's first Vice President of Marketing. Lawee was joined by partners Gene Frantz (formerly a partner at private equity firm TPG), Laela Sturdy (now managing partner; before joining CapitalG she was a Managing Director of Emerging Businesses at Google), Derek Zanutto (formerly at TPG, Hellman & Friedman and GIC) and Jesse Wedler (who joined CapitalG in 2013 out of Stanford business school).

CapitalG also comprises over 50 advisors from senior positions within Google, who offer portfolio companies guidance in business areas such as data science, engineering, marketing, and product management.

== Investments ==
Date	Company	Industry	Ref.
Unknown	MultiPlan	Healthcare	
January 2013	SurveyMonkey	Survey tool	
May 2013	LendingClub	Finance	
February 2014	Renaissance	Education	
March 2014	Auction.com	Real estate	
March 2014	Credit Karma	Finance	
June 2014	Freshdesk	Business software	
July 2014	MapR	Business software	
August 2014	Thumbtack	Service marketplace	
September 2014	InnoLight	Data center optics	
September 2014	Credit Karma	Finance	
January 2015	Glassdoor	Job platform	
January 2015	CommonFloor	Real estate	
April 2015	ZenPayroll	Payroll and employee management	
April 2015 (Note: Second investment in the company by CapitalG)	Freshdesk	Business software	
June 2015	Duolingo	Language education	
July 2015	Crowdstrike	Cybersecurity	
July 2015	FanDuel	Fantasy sport	
August 2015	Practo	Healthcare	
September 2015	Oscar Health	Health insurance	
September 2015	Zscaler	Cybersecurity	
2016	Snap Inc.	Social media	
January 2016	Pindrop	Information security	
March 2016	CarDekho	Car marketplace	
June 2016	Care.com	Care provider platform	
September 2016	Airbnb	Lodging	
November 2016	Stripe	Payments technology	
January 2017	Cuemath	Education	
March 2017	Looker	Data analytics	
October 2017	Lyft	Transportation	
March 2018	UiPath	Robotics process automation	
April 2018	Manbang	Transportation	
May 2018	Robinhood	Personal finance	
June 2018	Aye Finance	Finance	
July 2018 (Note: Third investment in the company by CapitalG)	Freshworks	Business software	
September 2018	Convoy	Trucking technology	
October 2018	Applied	Insurance software	
January 2019	Collibra	Data intelligence	
January 2019	CarDekho	Car marketplace	
March 2019	Cloudflare	Web performance and security	
October 2019	Unqork	Software development	
October 2019	Convoy	Trucking technology	
November 2019 (Note: Fourth investment in the company by CapitalG)	Freshworks	Business software	
December 2019	Duolingo	Language education	
December 2019	Dataiku	Data science software	
January 2020	Armis	Cybersecurity	
March 2020	Albert	Finance	
March 2020	Everlaw	Electronic discovery	
April 2020	Collibra	Data intelligence	
May 2020	Expel	Cybersecurity	
June 2020	Aye Finance	Finance	
August 2020	Dataiku	Data science software	
September 2020	NEXT Insurance	Insurance	
December 2020	Cuemath	Education	
August 2025	Clay	Sales automation	
February 2026, October 2026	Bedrock Robotics	Vehicular automation	

== Relationship to GV ==
CapitalG focuses on later-stage and growth equity investments, while GV invests in companies across all stages and industries. Another corporate division, Google's Corporate Development group, does acquisitions and investments that are strategic for Google's products and business.
