= General Rules for the Interpretation of the Harmonized System =

The General Rules for the Interpretation of the Harmonized System ("GRI") are the rules that govern the classification of goods under the Harmonized Commodity Description and Coding System (HS).

== Application ==
There are 6 General Rules in all, which must be applied in consecutive order.

1. GRI 1 prescribes how to classify products at the 4-digit Heading level, based on the wording of the headings and the relative HS Section and Chapter Notes.
2. GRI 2 prescribes how to classify both incomplete and unassembled goods, and mixtures and combinations of goods.
3. GRI 3 prescribes how to classify products that are, prima facie, classifiable under two different HS headings.
4. GRI 4 prescribes how to classify products that cannot be classified according to GRI's 1, 2, and 3.
5. GRI 5 prescribes how to classify packaging.
6. GRI 6 prescribes how to classify products at the 6-digit subheading level, based on the wording of the subheadings and the relative HS Section and Chapter Notes.
