= Flexport =

American supply chain management and logistics company

Flexport Inc.
- Type: Private
- Industry: Logistics; supply chain management
- Founded: 2013; 13 years ago
- Founders: Ryan Petersen; David Petersen
- Headquarters: Phelan Building, San Francisco, California, United States
- Key people: Ryan Petersen (chairman and CEO)
- Revenue: ▲US$2.1 billion (2024)
- Number of employees: 2,100 (2025)
- Website: flexport.com

Flexport Inc. is an American multinational corporation that focuses on supply chain management and logistics, including order management, delivery, trade financing, insurance, freight forwarding, and customs brokerage. The company is headquartered in San Francisco, California,

== History ==
Flexport was founded in 2013 by brothers Ryan and David Petersen.

Flexport's software integrates and connects ERP data from various companies involved in a supply chain, which allows them to manage information about cargo and streamline freight processing. As of 2017, it had raised $304M, including $110M in a Series C round.

As of 2017, Flexport has raised $94 million in venture capital from such investors as Peter Thiel’s Founders Fund, First Round Capital and Google Venture. In July 2016, it had 420 employees in seven offices, including Atlanta, Amsterdam, Hong Kong and Shenzhen, and was worth $365 million. In a 2017 interview to Forbes, Flexport's CEO Ryan Petersen said the company started opening their own warehouses for consolidating cargo customer shipments located in Hong Kong and L.A..

During the COVID-19 pandemic in 2020, Flexport announced layoffs along with other Silicon Valley tech startups.

In 2021, Flexport participated in seed round investment of Pakistan-based trucking startup Bridgelinx.

In 2022, Flexport "raised $935 million in a Series E funding round that values the freight forwarding company at $8 billion". In June 2022, Flexport announced that Amazon worldwide consumer chief Dave Clark would be joining Flexport as its new CEO.

In May 2023, Shopify sold its logistics service to Flexport in exchange for 13% of the company. Clark resigned in September 2023, and Petersen regained the CEO position. Upon his return, Petersen rescinded dozen of offers from successful applicants.

In November 2023, Flexport purchased the assets of Convoy, a former trucking software company previous valuated at over $1 billion that had shuttered operations several weeks before.

In January 2024, it was announced that the company had taken on an investment of $260 million from Shopify.
