= Dataiku =

French-American artificial intelligence

- Type: Private
- Industry: Computer software
- Founded: February 14, 2013; 13 years ago in Paris, France
- Founders: Florian Douetteau; Clément Stenac; Marc Batty; Thomas Cabrol
- Headquarters: New York City, United States
- Key people: Florian Douetteau (CEO)
- Products: Dataiku Data Science Studio
- Revenue: ▲US$150 million (2021)
- Number of employees: 1,000+ (2022)
- Website: dataiku.com

Dataiku is a French-American artificial intelligence (AI) and machine learning company which was founded in 2013 in Paris, France. In December 2019, Dataiku announced that CapitalG—the late-stage growth venture capital fund financed by Alphabet Inc.—joined Dataiku as an investor and that it had achieved unicorn status. As of 2021, Dataiku is valued at $4.6 billion. As of 2022, the company employs more than 1,000 people worldwide between offices in New York, Denver, Washington DC, Los Angeles, Paris, London, Munich, Frankfurt, Sydney, Singapore, Tokyo, and Dubai.

== History ==
Dataiku was founded in Paris in 2013 by Florian Douetteau, Clément Stenac, Thomas Cabrol and Marc Batty. In 2015, Dataiku established itself in the United States in New York City.

In January 2015, Dataiku raised $3.6 million from Serena Capital and Alven Capital, two French technology venture capital funds. This was followed by $14 million raised with FirstMark Capital, a New York City-based venture capital firm in October 2016.

In September 2017 the company raised a $28 million Series B investment from Battery Ventures, as well as historic investors.

In December 2018, Dataiku announced a $101 million Series C funding round led by ICONIQ Capital. Other investors included Alven Capital, Battery Ventures, Dawn Capital and FirstMark Capital.

In December 2019, one day after releasing Dataiku 6, Dataiku announced that CapitalG—the late-stage growth venture capital fund financed by Alphabet Inc.—purchased some of the shares previously owned by Serena Capital in a secondary round that valued Dataiku at $1.4 billion, making it a unicorn.

In August 2020, Dataiku announced an additional $100 million Series D funding round led by Stripes and Tiger Global Management, and participation from existing investors including Battery Ventures, CapitalG, Dawn Capital, FirstMark Capital, and ICONIQ. The company did not disclose its new valuation, but said that it was "still a unicorn".

In August 2021, Dataiku announced another $400 million raise Series E by Tiger Global Management, bringing its total valuation to $4.6 billion.

In December 2022, Dataiku announced a $200 million Series F led by new investor Wellington Management.

== Products ==
Dataiku Data Science Studio (Dataiku DSS) was announced in 2014 and supports predictive modelling to build business applications. The software is designed to make data science and machine learning easily accessed, particularly for those unfamiliar with programming languages, like Python.

In June 2021, Dataiku released Dataiku Online, a fully managed version of Dataiku, to target smaller companies, such as high-growth startups.

Dataiku introduced Kiji Inspector in 2026. The open-source framework is integrated with NVIDIA Nemotron to enhance the transparency of enterprise AI agents in critical environments, including fintech, energy, and other industries operating under regulatory compliance.

In 2026, the company commissioned a Harris Poll which reported that, of the 900 global CEOs polled, globally, 78% of CEOs feared that failure to demonstrate measurable returns from AI initiatives may lead to their own job loss by end of they year. In 2025, a similar poll assessed that 74% feared similar job loss.
