= Ryan Petersen (businessman) =

American businessman (born 1980/1981)

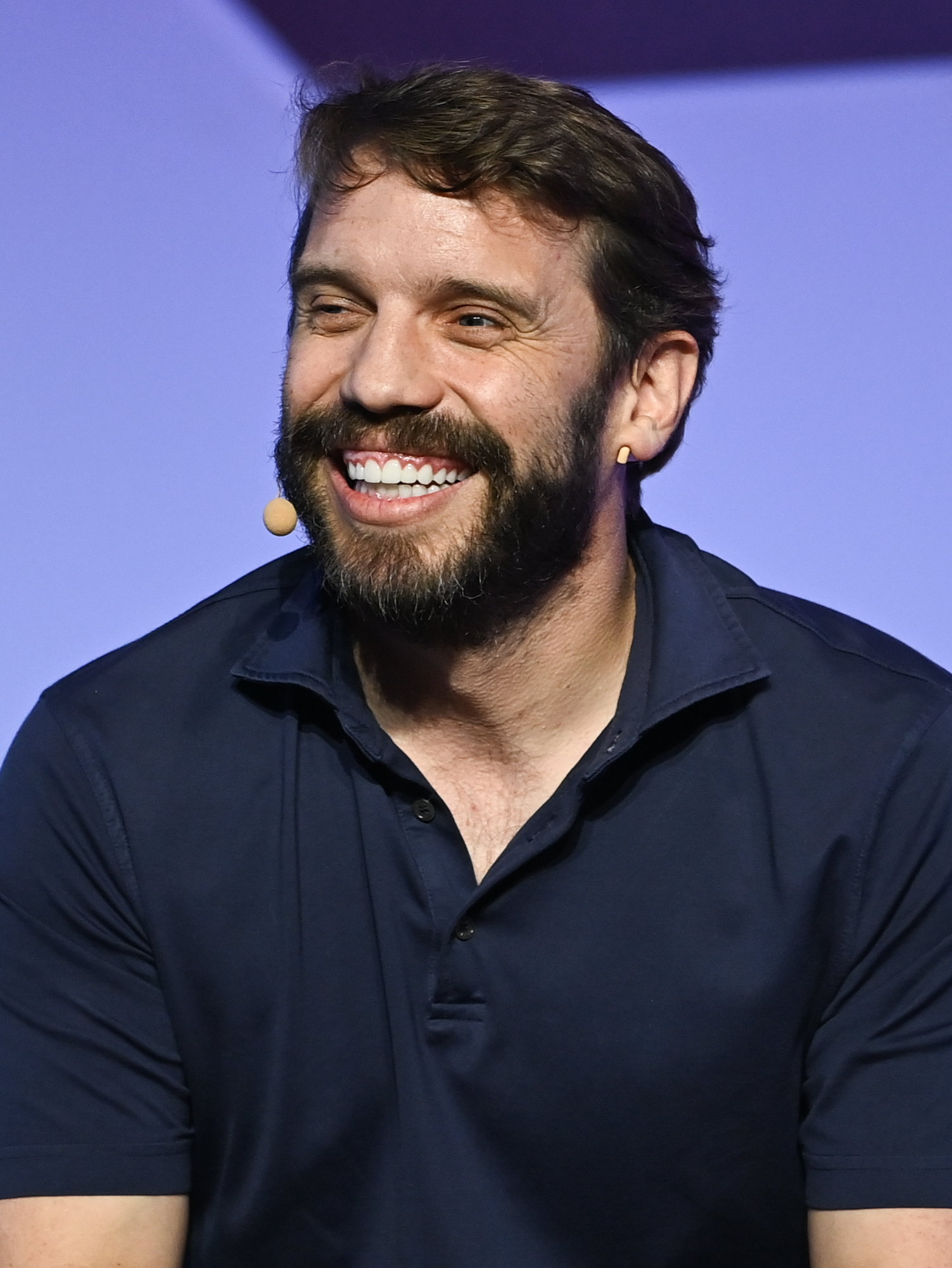
- Petersen in 2022
- Born: 1980 or 1981 (age 45–46); Bethesda, Maryland, United States
- Education: University of California, Berkeley, Columbia Business School (MBA)
- Occupation: Businessman
- Known for: Founder and CEO of freight forwarding and supply chain management company, Flexport
- Spouse: Olivia Zaleski
- Children: 2

Ryan Petersen (born 1980 or 1981) is an American businessman and the founder and CEO of Flexport, a technology-driven freight forwarding and supply chain management company. He is also a venture partner at Founders Fund since 2023. In his early career, he co-founded ImportGenius with his brother in 2006.

== Early life ==
Petersen grew up in Bethesda, Maryland. His father was a government economist and his mother was a biochemist who ran her own business. At the age of 17, he started an import-export business with his brother David, buying goods from China and selling them on EBay. After graduating with a Bachelor of Arts in economics from the University of California, Berkeley in 2002, he continued to work in import-exports. In 2005, Petersen moved to China to run the business.

In 2007, Ryan Petersen, his brother David Petersen, and Michael Kanko founded ImportGenius, a company that tracks information on international shipping.

He obtained an MBA from Columbia Business School in 2008.

== Flexport ==
In 2013, Petersen founded Flexport to sell international freight shipping and supply chain services to businesses, including tariffs, customs, and tracking. Petersen and Flexport were accepted into the startup accelerator Y Combinator in 2014. As of 2022, the company had a $8 billion valuation.

In 2021, Petersen shared on Twitter his proposals for addressing a shipping backlog at the ports of Los Angeles and Long Beach, based on first-hand observations. The suggestions gained attention on social media, reaching California Governor Gavin Newsom. Some of Petersen's suggestions to increase capacity for empty shipping containers higher were implemented by local authorities. The impact of the changes was difficult to measure, and voices in the logistics industry criticized Petersen for offering simplistic solutions to a complex problem.

In 2022, Petersen stepped down as CEO and appointed former Amazon executive Dave Clark as his successor. Petersen became executive chairman. In September 2023, Clark resigned abruptly and Petersen returned to the CEO role.

In early 2025, Petersen warned that the Trump administration's 145% tariffs on Chinese imports would bankrupt 80% of American small businesses that import from China.

== Personal life ==
Petersen is married to journalist Olivia Zaleski and they have two daughters.
