= Convoy (company) =

American trucking software company

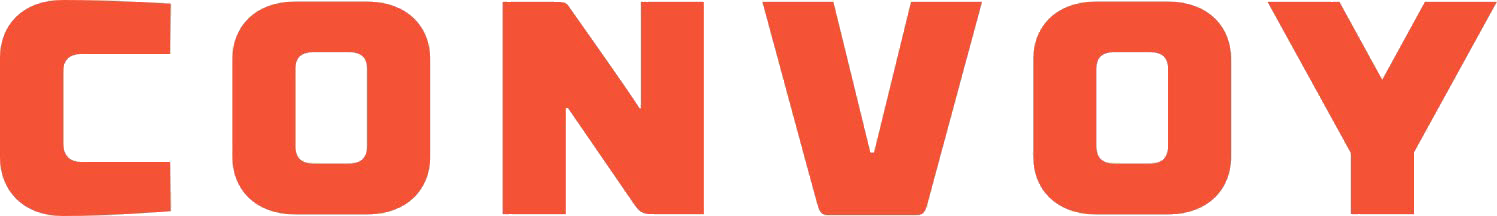
- Industry: Trucking software
- Founded: 2015
- Founders: Dan Lewis; Grant Goodale
- Defunct: 2023
- Fate: Operations shut down
- Headquarters: Seattle, Washington
- Website: convoy.com

Convoy was an American trucking software company co-founded by CEO Dan Lewis and CTO Grant Goodale. The company was shut down in November 2023, while its assets and some of the employees were acquired by Flexport.

== History ==
Former Amazon employees Dan Lewis and Grant Goodale co-founded Convoy in 2015.

On 25 July 2017, the company raised $62 million in Series B funding, led by Y Combinator's Continuity Fund. Other new investors included Cascade Investment CEO Bill Gates, Mosaic Ventures, former U.S. Senator Bill Bradley, and Barry Diller. This round of funding brought Convoy's total amount raised to $80 million.

They joined existing Convoy investors Greylock Partners (the VC fund of LinkedIn co-founder Reid Hoffman), Salesforce CEO Marc Benioff, Amazon founder Jeff Bezos via Bezos Expeditions, former Starbucks President Howard Behar, Code.org founders Hadi and Ali Partovi, and the founders & CEOs of eBay, Instagram, KKR, and Dropbox, among others.

Convoy was awarded GeekWire's 2017 Startup of the Year.

In 2018, Convoy raised $185 million led by CapitalG at a $1 billion valuation.

In 2019, Convoy raised $400 million, led by Generation Investment Management and T. Rowe Price at a $2.75 billion valuation.

In June 2023, Convoy's co-founder and chief technology officer, Goodale, left the company.

On 18 October 2023, Convoy cancelled all shipments amid rumors of an upcoming transition.

On 19 October 2023, Convoy ceased operations and laid off remaining staff. Remaining staff were given no severance and were told their stock options were worthless. In a memo sent that day to employees, Lewis points to "a massive freight recession and a contraction in the capital markets" as major factors resulting in the company's failure. On 1 November 2023, supply chain company Flexport acquired Convoy's assets for $16M and retained a small group of about fifty employees. Convoy's co-founder and CEO, Lewis, joined Flexport as part of the deal. Dan Lewis subsequently left Flexport in late 2024 and joined Microsoft in early 2025.

Flexport relaunched the Convoy Platform in February 2024, focusing on providing software services to third party trucking brokers. This was in contrast to the pre-Flexport business model wherein Convoy was primarily a trucking broker working directly with shippers.

In July 2025, DAT Solutions purchased the Convoy Platform from Flexport for $250M and hired most of the remaining Convoy Platform employees.

Several former Convoy employees went on to found their own startups. These include GoodShip, a freight analytics software company founded in 2022 by Ryan Soskin, a former senior manager of growth and pricing at Convoy, and David Tsai, Convoy's former head of marketplace engineering.
