= 6th Anti-Money Laundering Directive =

The 6th Anti-Money Laundering Directive (6AMLD) is an EU directive.

== Motivation ==
Linus Neumann of the Chaos Computer Club argues that blockchain-based currencies are not in the interest of the user.

According to the German Customs Investigation Bureau, the amount of events associated with cryptocurrency rose eightfold between 2018 and 2021.

== Obligations of the crypto currency industry ==
The directive as proposed is among the most aggressive in the world, according to Böck of the University of Innsbruck. The new rules demand that e.g. cryptocurrency exchanges vet transactions above 1000 EUR.

== Enforcement ==
The 6AMLD raises requirements on suppliers of goods such as watches, precious metals, expensive cars, or aircraft. Real estate agents are also forced to report suspicious activity.

The European Public Prosecutor's Office and the European Anti-Fraud Office (OLAF) gets direct and free access to all registers in the EU.

== See also ==
- Anti-Money Laundering Authority
- AMLAR
