= Trade data =

Trade data, or import and export statistics, consist of statistical data about international trade, typically organized by time period, country, and commodity (using HS codes). They are used by governments, corporations, manufacturers, law firms, trade associations, and international organizations to monitor the commodity markets relevant to their interests.

== Data coverage ==
Different sources of trade data may provide more or less complete data coverage, and more or less detail:

- reported vs. mirrored: One key distinction in trade data is between the reporting country (the country that provides data) and the partner country (the country listed as an export partner or import partner in the data provided by a reporting country). Usually, the official sources of a reporting country provide the best data about the country's own imports and exports. If this information is not available, trade data analysts often rely on "mirrored" data: data about the country as a partner country listed by other reporting countries. In other words, analysts attempt to reconstruct information about a country's imports and exports based on what other countries have reported exporting to and importing from it. The disadvantages are that truly complete "mirrored" data would require data from every other country (not all countries provide trade data), and also that because of methodological differences, "country X’s reported exports to country Y rarely match country Y’s reported imports from country X."
- countries, etc.: Different sources include different numbers of countries, because not all countries report trade data at all, and for many other countries trade data is not publicly available. Some sources provide trade data for groups of countries (such as the European Union), and some provide trade data for parts of countries (such as states in the United States and provinces in China).
- commodity detail: HS codes for commodities are of different lengths, with shorter codes indicating broader categories of commodities and longer codes indicating more specific subcategories. The first two digits indicate the broadest categories of commodities (e.g., 01 indicates live animals), the first four digits indicate subcategories (e.g., 0101 indicates horses, donkeys, and their hybrids, mules and hinnies), and the first six digits indicate sub-subcategories (e.g., 010121 indicates purebred horses for breeding). Individual countries use even more specific and longer codes (e.g., in the United States, 0101210010 indicates male purebred horses for breeding). Trade data may be provided without commodity codes (i.e., a nation's total imports or exports), or with only two-digit HS codes. The most flexible and complete trade data sources, however, allow users to view statistical data at any level of detail: total of all commodities (i.e., total imports or total exports), international HS codes from two-digit to six-digit, and national commodity codes.
- annual vs. monthly: Sources may provide a country's annual totals without a breakdown by month, or provide trade data for each month in addition to annual totals.
- trade data tools: Some platforms also provide publicly accessible tools to help users explore trade data concepts, HS codes, and mirrored trade insights. For example, TradeInt offers educational resources on understanding import–export data, explanations of mirrored trade data, and free HS code lookup tools, including global search and country-specific HS code references such as Malaysia and Turkey.

== Uses ==
- Trade data can be used to assess supply and demand for particular commodities in particular countries, which is useful not only to analysts but to companies seeking suppliers and customers.
- Trade data can also reveal how international trade responds to, and has an impact on, world events such as the China–United States trade war and the COVID-19 pandemic
- Trade data can reveal general trends in world trade and impact on particular regions and industries.
- Trade data can inform government assessments of national trade partners and government regulatory decisions about international trade.

== Sources ==
=== National sources ===
The ultimate source of trade data for a particular country is at the national level, usually the national statistical office, but sometimes "central banks, customs administrations and specialized governmental organizations." Some nations make their trade data publicly available online (in interfaces of varying user-friendliness), others provide it upon request, and yet others do not publish their trade data directly. To view data from multiple countries, or data from countries that do not publish their own data directly, users must rely on intergovernmental or commercial organizations that compile trade data from multiple national sources.

=== Intergovernmental sources ===
- United Nations Commodity Trade Database
- Trade Map, trade statistics for international business development
- WTO Statistics Portal
- Statistical Portal: OECD
- European Union International Trade in Goods Data
- Food and Agricultural Trade Data by FAO

=== Commercial sources ===
Although commercial sources charge for their services, they often offer some advantages over intergovernmental sources. For example, UN Comtrade is the official trade data source of the United Nations but is limited in the timeliness of its data. As of 14 October 2020, UN Comtrade only had January 2020 data for 73 countries, and only had August 2020 data for 15 countries. By contrast, the trade data company Trade Data Monitor boasts over 100 countries’ monthly data available "within hours of release from the source." China provides a striking example: as of 2020, UN Comtrade’s latest monthly data for China was from 2017, whereas Trade Data Monitor regularly reports China's trade statistics for the previous month.
