= Common Customs Tariff (European Union) =

The Common Customs Tariff (CCT) is the common external tariff of the European Union (EU). It is applicable to the import of goods into any part of the European Union Customs Union (EUCU) from the rest of the world.

Tariff rates are determined by the Council of the European Union on the basis of the proposals presented by the European Commission. The average tariff rate in 2022 was 3.6%. Different tariff rates are applicable to different goods under the CCT.

The legal framework for customs rules and procedures are comprised within a code known as the Union Customs Code (UCC). Duty paid under the CCT is collected by national customs authorities rather than by the EU itself.

Practical information relevant for importers, including in relation to the classification of goods for import, is comprised within a database known as the Integrated Tariff of the European Union (Tarif Intégré de l'Union Européenne, TARIC) which provides a TARIC code.
