= Tariq (surname) =

Tariq or Tarique is a surname. Notable people with the surname include:

== Tariq ==
- Ambreen Tariq, American author, activist and founder of @BrownPeopleCamping
- Ban Ziad Tariq, Iraqi psychiatric (1991–2025)
- Kashmala Tariq, Pakistani politician
- Shahbaz Tariq (born 1948), Norwegian politician
- Shazia Tariq (born 1983), Pakistani politician

== Tareque ==
- Mohammad Tareque, Banglashi former civil servant
- Najib Tareque (born 1970), Bengali artist, printmaker and writer
