= TARIC code =

Rules on imported products to the EU

The TARIC code (TARif Intégré Communautaire; Integrated Tariff of the European Communities) is designed to show the various rules applying to specific products when imported into the EU. This includes the provisions of the harmonised system and the combined nomenclature but also additional provisions specified in Community legislation such as tariff suspensions, tariff quotas and tariff preferences, which exist for the majority of the Community’s trading partners. In trade with third countries, the 10-digit Taric code must be used in customs and statistical declarations.

== Challenges in classification for companies ==
A classification can save money for the company. Importers and exporters strive to find a perfect way to solve those problems:

- Variety of products — Companies who do import and export meet challenges of how to classify products with the growing varieties of products. Classification and restrictions, to some extent, has a bad effect on free trading and growing of business.
- Risk of loss caused by difference in classification — Firstly, the proper classification of your item is essential to determine any licensing requirements under the Export Administration Regulations (EAR), EU Dual Use Regulation 428/2009. And subsequently exporters and importers need to be aware of how to classify the products accordingly and which category should be classified to. And finally they may be required to obtain a license. A slight difference in classification can mean a huge difference in the duties that are paid.

== Overview ==
TARIC builds upon the international harmonised system

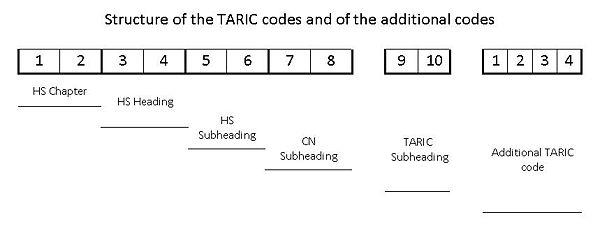

	digits	Example	
HS Chapter	2	18	Cocoa and Cocoa Preparations
HS Heading	2	1806	Chocolate and other food preparations containing cocoa
HS SubHeading	2	1806 10	Cocoa powder, containing added sugar or other sweetening matter
CN SubHeading	2	1806 10 15	Containing no sucrose or containing less than 5% by weight of sucrose (including invert sugar expressed as sucrose) or isoglucose expressed as sucrose
TARIC Sub Heading	2	1806 10 15 00	

== See also ==
- Combined Nomenclature
- Customs tariff
- Harmonized System
