= Harmonized System =

Coding of traded products by the World Customs Organization

The Harmonized Commodity Description and Coding System, also known as the Harmonized System (HS) of tariff nomenclature is an internationally standardized system of names and numbers to classify traded products. It came into effect in 1988 and has since been developed and maintained by the World Customs Organization (WCO) (formerly the Customs Co-operation Council), an independent intergovernmental organization based in Brussels, Belgium.

It is used by over 200 WCO member countries and economies as a basis for their Customs tariffs and for the collection of international trade statistics as well as many other purposes.

== Structure ==
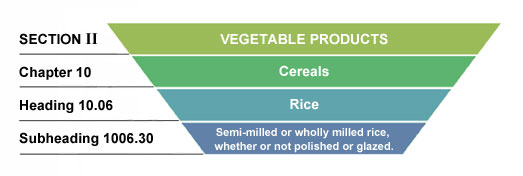
Example of the hierarchical structure of the Harmonized System

The HS is organized logically by economic activity or component material. For example, animals and animal products are found in one section of the HS, while machinery and mechanical appliances are found in another. The HS is organized into 21 Sections, which are subdivided into 96 Chapters (Chapters 1 to 97 with Chapter 77 reserved for potential future use by the HS). The 96 HS Chapters are further subdivided into 1,228 headings and 5,612 subheadings in the current 2022 edition of the HS.

Section and Chapter titles describe broad categories of goods, while headings and subheadings describe products in more detail. Generally, HS Sections and Chapters are arranged in order of a product's degree of manufacture or in terms of its technological complexity. Natural commodities, such as live animals and vegetables, for example, are described in the early Sections of the HS, whereas more evolved goods such as machinery and precision instruments are described in later Sections. Chapters within the individual Sections are also usually organized in order of complexity or degree of manufacture. For example, within Section X (Pulp of wood or of other fibrous cellulosic material; Recovered (waste and scrap) paper or paperboard; Paper and paperboard and articles thereof), Chapter 47 provides for pulp of wood or of other fibrous cellulosic materials, whereas Chapter 49 covers printed books, newspapers, and other printed matter. Finally, the headings within individual Chapters follow a similar order. For example, the first heading in Chapter 50 (Silk) provides for silk worm cocoons while articles made of silk are covered by the Chapter's later headings.

The HS code consists of 6-digits. The first two digits designate the Chapter wherein headings and subheadings appear. The second two digits designate the position of the heading in the Chapter. The last two digits designate the position of the subheading in the heading. HS code 1006.30, for example, indicates Chapter 10 (Cereals), heading 10.06 (Rice), and subheading 1006.30 (Semi-milled or wholly milled rice, whether or not polished or glazed).

In addition to the HS codes and commodity descriptions, each Section and Chapter of the HS is prefaced by Legal Notes, which are designed to clarify the proper classification of goods.

To ensure harmonization, the Contracting Parties to the Convention on the Harmonized Commodity Description and Coding System, have agreed to base their national tariff schedules on the HS Nomenclature and Legal Notes. Parties are permitted to subdivide the HS Nomenclature beyond 6-digits and add their own Legal Notes according to their own tariff and statistical requirements. Parties often set their customs duties at the 8-digit "tariff code" level. Statistical suffixes are often added to the 8-digit tariff code for a total of 10 digits. If the number of digits are more than 6, additional digits are called as the national subdivision.

Chapter 77 is reserved for future use by the HS. Chapters 98 and 99 are reserved for domestic use for the Contracting Parties to the HS Convention.

Since its creation, the HS has undergone several revisions to reflect changes in trade. These revisions eliminate some headings and subheadings describing commodities with low volume of trade and create new headings and subheadings that address new needs, for example, to reflect technological advancements or monitor goods posing environmental concerns. The current edition of the HS became effective on 1 January 2022.

== Classification ==
The process of assigning HS codes is known as "HS Classification". All products can be classified in the HS by using the General Rules for the Interpretation of the Harmonized System ("GRI") that must be applied in strict order. HS codes can be determined by a variety of factors including a product's composition, its form and its function. An example of a product classified according to its form would be whole potatoes. The classification will also change depending on whether the potatoes are fresh or frozen. Fresh potatoes are classified, under heading 07.01 (Potatoes, fresh or chilled), more specifically under subheading 0701.90 (Other), while frozen potatoes are classified, under heading 07.10 (Vegetables (uncooked or cooked by steaming or boiling in water), frozen), more specifically under subheading 0710.10 (Potatoes).

An example of a product classified according its material composition is a picture frame. Picture frames made of tropical wood are classified under heading 44.14 (Wooden frames for paintings, photographs, mirrors or similar objects), more specifically under subheading 4414.10 (Of tropical wood). Picture frames made of plastic are classified under heading 39.24 (Tableware, kitchenware, other household articles and hygienic or toilet articles, of plastics), more specifically under subheading 3924.90 (Other). Picture frames made of glass are classified under heading 7020.00 (Other articles of glass), the ".00" at the end indicates the heading is not further subdivided.

An example of a product classified according to its form is personal hygiene soap. When in the form of a bar, cake or moulded shape, such soap is classified under heading 34.01 (Soap, among others), then under 1-dash subheading 3401.1 (Soap and organic surface-active products and preparations, in the form of bars, cakes, moulded pieces or shapes, and paper, wadding, felt and nonwovens, impregnated, coated or covered with soap or detergent), and under 2-dash subheading 3401.11 (For toilet use (including medicated products)). Conversely, liquid personal hygiene soap, depending on what is in the liquid, is classified under either subheading 3401.20 (Soap in other forms), or subheading 3401.30 (Organic surface-active products and preparations for washing the skin, in the form of liquid or cream and put up for retail sale, whether or not containing soap).

An example of a product classified according to its function is a carbon monoxide (CO) detector. If the CO detector captures and displays gas measurements, then it is properly classified under subheading 9027.10 (Gas or smoke analysis apparatus), under heading 90.27 (Instruments and apparatus for physical or chemical analysis (for example, polarimeters, refractometers, spectrometers, gas or smoke analysis apparatus); instruments and apparatus for measuring or checking viscosity, porosity, expansion, surface tension or the like; instruments and apparatus for measuring or checking quantities of heat, sound or light (including exposure meters); microtomes). If the CO detector does not capture and display gas measurements, then it is properly classified under subheading 8531.10 (Burglar or fire alarms and similar apparatus), under heading 85.31 (Electric sound or visual signaling apparatus (for example, bells, sirens, indicator panels, burglar or fire alarms), other than those of heading 85.12 or 85.30).

Although every product and every part of every product is classifiable in the HS, very few are explicitly described in the HS Nomenclature. Any product for which there is no explicit description can be classified under a "residual" or "basket" heading or subheading, which provide for Other goods. Residual codes normally occur last in numerical order under their related headings and subheadings. An example of a product classified under a residual heading is a live dog, which must be classified under heading 01.06, which provides for Other live animals because dogs are not covered by headings 01.01 through 01.05, which explicitly provide for live equine, live bovine, live swine, live sheep and goats, and live poultry, respectively.

== Applications ==
As of 2022, there were more than 200 countries or economies applying the Harmonized System worldwide. HS codes are used by Customs authorities, statistical agencies, and other government regulatory bodies, to monitor and control the import and export of commodities through:

- Customs tariffs
- Collection of trade data (international trade statistics)
- Rules of origin
- Collection of internal taxes
- Trade negotiations (e.g., the schedules of tariff concessions of the World Trade Organization)
- Transport tariffs and statistics
- Monitoring of controlled goods (e.g., wastes, narcotics, chemical weapons, ozone layer depleting substances, endangered species, wildlife trade)
- Other areas of Customs controls and procedures, including risk assessment, information technology and compliance.

Companies use HS codes to calculate the total landed cost of imported products and parts, and to identify selling and sourcing opportunities abroad.

== Challenges in classification for companies ==
HS classification is not always straightforward. Many automotive parts, for example, are not classified under heading 87.08, which provides for Parts and accessories of the motor vehicles of headings 87.01 to 87.05. For example, automotive seats are classified as articles of furniture under heading 94.01, which provides for Seats (other than those of heading 94.02), whether or not convertible into beds, and parts thereof, and more specifically under subheading 9401.20, which provides for Seats of a kind used for motor vehicles.

In many jurisdictions, traders alone bear the legal responsibility to accurately classify their goods. However, due to a lack of familiarity with the rules of HS classification traders may inadvertently determine erroneous HS codes for their commodities. Depending on the severity of the infraction, incorrect classification can result in the imposition of non-compliance penalties, border delays or seizures, or denial of import privileges.

There are multiple resources available to traders to assist in properly classifying their goods including the following.

Global

- The Official Explanatory Notes to the Harmonized System, published by the World Customs Organization (WCO) (Paid publication)
- The WCO Trade Tools (WCO online database for the HS, Valuation and Origin, containing both free and paid content, with the legal text of the Harmonized System freely available)

National or Regional

- The US Census "Classify your Commodity" engine
- Classify your Commodity video tutorial by US Census
- Explanatory notes to the Combined Nomenclature of the European Union by the European Commission
- Customs Rulings Online Search System (CROSS), by U.S. Customs and Border Protection
- Binding Tariff Information (BTI), by the European Commission
- Informed compliance publications, by U.S. Customs and Border Protection
- Classification Guides, by HM Revenue & Customs
- Harmonized Tariff Schedule as the principal US page with updated info about Tariffs.
- Integral System of Trade Information (SIICEX) by the Confederation of Associations of Custom Brokers of the Mexican Republic (CAAAREM). It provides updated information about tariffs and explanatory notes in order to import and export goods from/to Mexico. It compiles information of many national and international legal regulations.

Traders may sometimes resort to using HS code determination guides and other references to classify their traded commodities. These could include local databases published by authorities in other countries. However, such databases are not valid globally.

Many Customs authorities around the world allow traders to apply for an advanced HS classification ruling. Such rulings are legally binding in the countries where they are issued and give certainty to the trader. Provided the information supplied in the request was truthful and valid, they may also provide legal protection to the trader following the ruling if there are future questions on the classification of the goods.

== See also ==
- Automated Export System
- Broad Economic Categories
- Combined Nomenclature
- Customs tariff
- Harmonized Tariff Schedule for the United States
- Standard International Trade Classification
- TARIC Coding System
- UNSPSC
- World Customs Organization
