= Toronto and Region Islamic Congregation =

Islamic centre in Toronto, Ontario, Canada

- Location within Toronto
- Founded: 1977
- Founder: World Islamic Call Society
- Type: Islamic center, mosque, education, and activities
- Location(s): 99 Beverly Hills Drive, Toronto, Ontario M3L 1A2
- Coordinates: 43°43′05″N 79°30′58″W
- Region served: Greater Toronto
- Website: taric.org

The Toronto and Region Islamic Congregation, commonly referred to by its acronym as TARIC Islamic Center, is one of the largest Islamic centers in the city of Toronto, Ontario, Canada, formerly in the city of North York. With its distinct box-shaped oriental motif, TARIC makes an unusual and highly visible landmark in the city of Toronto, primarily due to its location near the busy multi-level Hwy 401/Hwy 400 interchange.

== History and organization ==
The building of TARIC was originally conceived after securing a grant from the World Islamic Call Society, following which purchase of 2.2 acres (0.89 ha) was completed in 1977. However, it took over a decade to accumulate the necessary additional funds for the construction of a building. The current building structure was completed and opened to the public in 1991, and is the first of a two-phase complex of a much larger building. The TARIC building houses a library, a gymnasium and the main prayer hall. With a full-time imam, weekend classes on Arabic and the basics of Islam are taught, as well as dawah programs and dialogue with local community and neighbourhood organizations.

TARIC's goal is to bring the message of Islam to Muslims and non-Muslims, including the importance of the five pillars of Islam, encouraging Muslims to read the Qur'an, and to practice zikir.

== Activities ==
According to the Gulf Weekly, "..The TARIC Islamic Centre, probably the most vibrant and effective in reaching out to non-Muslims is, perhaps the premier Muslim outfit in Metropolitan Toronto."

A large number of programmes are carried out at the Centre. These include: adult Tarbiya class on Sundays, Arabic language classes, Aamarriage introduction service, ,arriage and family counseling, conducting marriages and funerals, an Islamic bookstore, interfaith dialogue, Dawa programmes for non-Muslims, mosque visits, political and social awareness programmes, seminars on Islamic and secular subjects, family nights, summer camps, weekly youth activities, as well as other women’s programmes.

Until 2003, TARIC leased a building from the Toronto District School Board for an Islamic school for Junior Kindergarten to Grade 8 children.

== See also ==
- Islam in Canada
- List of mosques in Canada
