= Combined Nomenclature =

European Union goods nomenclature

Combined Nomenclature (CN) is the 8-digit customs nomenclature for imported goods in the European Union (EU). It is used as the basis for the classification of imported goods under the EU's Common Customs Tariff (TARIC) and the compilation of the EU's external trade statistics. It was established under the Council Regulation (EEC) No 2658/87 of 23 July 1987. The CN provides the basis for the 10-digit classifications referred to as TARIC codes.

The CN is based on the 6-digit Harmonized System (HS), the global system of nomenclature that is used to describe most world trade in goods, maintained by the World Customs Organization (WCO). Virtually all countries base their tariff schedules on the WCO's Harmonized System.

== Synopsis ==
The codes and the descriptions of goods established on the basis of the combined nomenclature shall replace those established on the basis of the nomenclatures of the Common Customs Tariff and the Nimexe.

It is established on the basis of the Harmonized System. The combined nomenclature shall comprise : (a) the harmonized system nomenclature; (b) Community subdivisions to that nomenclature, referred to as 'CN subheadings' in those cases where a corresponding rate of duty is specified; (c) preliminary provisions, additional section or chapter notes and footnotes relating to CN subheadings.

Each CN subheading has an eight digit code number: (a) the first six digits shall be the code numbers relating to the headings and subheadings of the harmonized system nomenclature; (b) the seventh and eighth digits shall identify the CN subheadings.

The European Commission established an integrated tariff of the European Communities, referred to as the 'TARIC code', based on the combined nomenclature.

The combined nomenclature, together with the rates of duty and other relevant charges, and the tariff measures included in the Taric or in other Community arrangements shall constitute the common customs tariff referred to in Article 9 of the Treaty, which shall be applied on the importation of goods into the Community.

Member States may insert subdivisions after the CN subheadings for national statistical purposes, and after the Taric subheadings for other national purposes.

The Commission shall be assisted by a Committee on Tariff and Statistical Nomenclature, called the 'Nomenclature Committee'.

'Favourable tariff arrangement' means any reduction or suspension, even under a tariff quota, of a customs duty or charge having equivalent effect or of an agricultural levy or other import charge provided for under the common agricultural policy or under the specific arrangements applicable to certain goods resulting from the processing of agricultural products.

== History ==
=== Implementing regulations ===
The Commission adopts an Implementing Regulation each year which reissues a complete version of the CN, together with the corresponding autonomous and conventional rates of duty of the Common Customs Tariff, as it results from measures adopted by the council or by the commission. This Regulation is to be published no later than 31 October in the Official Journal of the European Union (OJEU) and applies from 1 January in the following year.

List of published versions of the Combined Nomenclature
Applies from	Title	Published in
1 January 2019	Commission Implementing Regulation (EU) 2018/1602 of 11 October 2018	OJEU, L 273, 31 October 2018
1 January 2020	Commission Implementing Regulation (EU) 2019/1776 of 9 October 2019	OJEU, L 280, 31 October 2019
1 January 2021	Commission Implementing Regulation (EU) 2020/1577 of 21 September 2020	OJEU, L 361, 30 October 2020
1 January 2022	Commission Implementing Regulation (EU) 2021/1832 of 12 October 2021	OJEU, L 385, 29 October 2021
1 January 2023	Commission Implementing Regulation (EU) 2022/1998 of 20 September 2022	OJEU, L 282, 31 October 2022
1 January 2024	Commission Implementing Regulation (EU) 2023/2364 of 26 September 2023	OJEU, L Series, 31 October 2023 (Note: The Official Journal of the European Union switched to act-by-act publication on 1 October 2023.)
1 January 2025	Commission Implementing Regulation (EU) 2024/2020 of 26 July 2024	OJEU, L Series, 29 July 2024
1 January 2026	Commission Implementing Regulation (EU) 2025/1926 of 22 September 2025	OJEU, L Series, 31 October 2025

=== Sanctions ===
CN code 2710 goods exported out of Russia were the subject of an embargo price cap starting on 4 February 2023 as a result of the 2022 Russian invasion of Ukraine.

== Dynamic Updates and Technological Adaptation ==
The Combined Nomenclature is amended annually to ensure it remains relevant for classifying new and evolving products. This regular update cycle allows the CN to integrate decisions from the World Customs Organization, codify rulings from the Court of Justice of the European Union, and create new classifications for innovative goods.

Examples of updates driven by technological developments include:

- Electronic Nicotine Delivery Systems (ENDS): Following the market emergence of "e-cigarettes," divergent classifications by national customs authorities created legal uncertainty and inconsistent application of the Tobacco Products Directive. To ensure uniform application, the European Commission issued a binding classification regulation in 2020, mandating that such devices be classified under specific CN code.
- Electric Vehicle Batteries: To support the EU's strategic industrial monitoring for the green transition, the 2022 CN update introduced a specific subheading exclusively for lithium-ion batteries used for electric vehicle propulsion. This created a distinct statistical category separate from batteries for consumer electronics, enabling precise tracking of trade in this critical component.

These adaptations demonstrate the CN's function as a dynamic legal instrument, actively used to resolve classification disputes arising from innovation, ensure the uniform functioning of the single market for new products, and generate data aligned with broader EU policy objectives.
