= Etim =

Etim may refer to:

== People ==
=== Given name ===
- Etim Inyang (1931–2016), Nigerian police officer
- Etim Moses Essien (born 1934), Nigerian haematologist
- Etim Esin (born 1966), Nigerian football player

=== Surname ===
- Emmanuel Etim (born 1980), Nigerian politician
- Ernest Ibok Etim-Bassey (1926–1998), Nigerian politician
- Margaret Etim (born 1992), Nigerian sprinter
- Matthew Etim (born 1989), Nigerian football player
- Monday Etim (born 1998), Nigerian football player
- Nse Ikpe-Etim (born 1974), Nigerian actress
- Terry Etim (born 1986), English mixed martial artist

== Places ==
- Etim Ekpo, Nigeria

== Standards ==
- ETIM (standard), international product classification system

== Other ==
- Turkistan Islamic Party, formerly known as the East Turkestan Islamic Movement or ETIM
