= Sheila McIlraith =

Professor of Computer Science

- Born: Sheila Ann McIlraith
- Education: University of Toronto (PhD)
- Known for: Semantic web services
- Awards: AAAI Fellow (2011); ACM Fellow (2019)
- Scientific career
- Fields: Artificial Intelligence; World Wide Web; Computer Science; AI Planning
- Workplaces: University of Toronto; Xerox PARC; Stanford University
- Thesis: Towards a formal account of diagnostic problem solving (1997)
- Doctoral advisor: Raymond Reiter
- Website: www.cs.toronto.edu/~sheila

Sheila Ann McIlraith is a Canadian computer scientist specializing in artificial intelligence. She is a Professor in the Department of Computer Science, University of Toronto. She is a Canada CIFAR AI Chair, a faculty member of the Vector Institute, and Associate Director and Research Lead of the Schwartz Reisman Institute for Technology and Society.

== Education ==
McIlraith earned her PhD at the University of Toronto under the supervision of Raymond Reiter.

== Research and career ==
McIlraith worked as a postdoctoral researcher at Xerox PARC and as a research scientist at Stanford University before returning to the University of Toronto as a faculty member in 2004.

McIlraith’s research is in the area of AI knowledge representation and reasoning, automated planning, and machine learning where she currently studies sequential decision-making, broadly construed, with a focus on human-compatible AI. Her research was seminal to the area of semantic web services and had made practical contributions to the development of emerging web standards such as DAML-S/OWL-S and computer-aided diagnosis systems.

McIlraith served as program co-chair for the Association for the Advancement of Artificial Intelligence (AAAI) Conference in 2018, as program co-chair of the 13th International Conference on Principles of Knowledge Representation and Reasoning (KR2012), and as program co-chair of the International Semantic Web Conference (ISWC) in 2004.

== Awards and honors ==
McIlraith was elected an ACM Fellow in 2019 "for contributions to knowledge representation and its applications to automated planning and semantic web services". She was also elected an AAAI Fellow in 2011 “for significant contributions to knowledge representation, reasoning about action, and the formal foundations of the semantic web and diagnostic problem solving”. She and co-authors have been recognized with two 10 year test of time awards from the International Semantic Web Conference (ISWC) in 2011, and from the International Conference on Automated Planning and Scheduling (ICAPS) in 2022.
