= Tomasz Imieliński =

Polish-American computer scientist (born 1954)

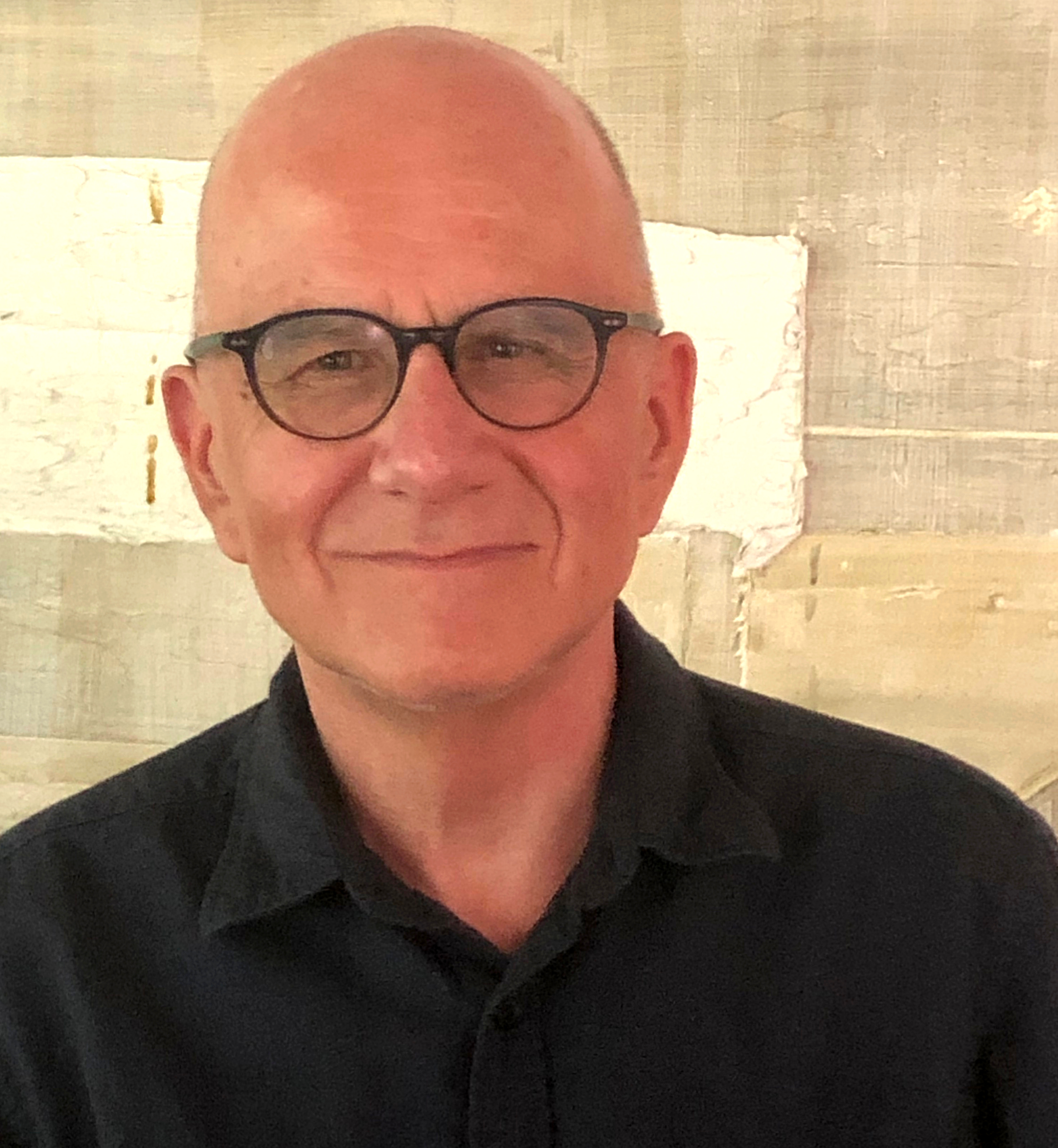
- Born: July 11, 1954 (age 72); Toruń, Poland
- Education: Polish Academy of Sciences (PhD); Politechnika Gdańska (BE/MEng)
- Known for: Imieliński-Lipski algebra association rule learning data mining mobile computing
- Awards: SIGMOD Test of Time Award (2003); VLDB 10 Year Award (2003); PIASA Tadeusz Sendzimir Applied Sciences Award (2018)
- Scientific career
- Fields: Computer Science; Databases; Data Mining; Mobile Computing; Search engine technology
- Workplaces: Rutgers University; McGill University; Polish Academy of Sciences
- Doctoral advisor: Witold Lipski

Tomasz Imieliński (born July 11, 1954, in Toruń, Poland) is a Polish-American computer scientist, most known in the areas of data mining, mobile computing, data extraction, and search engine technology. He is currently a professor of computer science at Rutgers University in New Jersey, United States.

In 2000, he co-founded Connotate Technologies, a web data extraction company based in New Brunswick, NJ. Since 2004 till 2010 he had held multiple positions at Ask.com, from vice president of data solutions intelligence to executive vice president of global search and answers and chief scientist. From 2010 to 2012 he served as VP of data solutions at IAC/Pronto.

Tomasz Imieliński served as chairman of the Computer Science Department at Rutgers University from 1996 to 2003.

He co-founded, with Celina Imielińska and Konrad Imieliński Art Data Laboratories LLC company, and its product, Articker is the largest known database that aggregates dynamic non-price information about the visual artists in the global art market. Articker has been under an exclusive partnership with Phillips auction house.

== Education ==
Tomasz Imieliński graduated with B.E/M.E degree in electrical engineering from Politechnika Gdańska in Gdańsk, Poland, and received his PhD, in 1982, in computer science, from Polish Academy of Sciences, in Poland, under supervision of Witold Lipski.

== Career ==
After receiving his PhD, Tomasz Imieliński joined, for a year, faculty at the McGill University School of Computer Science at McGill University in Montreal. Since 1983, he joined the Computer Science Department at Rutgers University, in New Brunswick. He served as a chairman of the department, from 1996 to 2003. In 2000, he co-founded Connotate Technologies based on his data extraction research developed at Rutgers University. While on leave from Rutgers University, from 2004 to 2010, he had held multiple positions at Ask.com: vice president of data solutions, executive vice president of global search and answers, and chief scientist. Between 2010 and 2012, Tomasz Imieliński served as vice president of data solutions at Pronto. Tomasz Imieliński received numerous awards, such as 2018 The Tadeusz Sendzimir Applied Sciences Award.

== Research and recognition ==
Imieliński-Lipski Algebras

Imieliński's early work on 'Incomplete Information in Relational Databases' produced a fundamental concept of incomplete databases that became later known as Imieliński-Lipski Algebras.

Cylindric Algebras

According to Van den Bussche, the first people from database community to recognize the connection between Codd's relational algebra and Tarski's cylindric algebras were Witold Lipski and Tomasz Imieliński, in a talk given at the very first edition of PODS (the ACM Symposium on Principles of Database Systems), in 1982. Their work,"The relational model of data and cylindric algebras" was later published in 1984.

Association Rule Mining

His joint 1993 paper with Agrawal and Swami, 'Mining Association Rules Between Sets of Items in Large Databases' started the association rule mining research area, and it is one of the most cited publications in computer science, with over 25,000 citations according to Google Scholar. This paper received the 2003 - 10 year Test of Time ACM SIGMOD award,.

Mobile Computing

Imieliński has also been one of the pioneers of mobile computing and for his joint 1992 paper with Badri Nath on 'Querying in highly mobile distributed environments' he received the VLDB Ten Year Award in 2002.

Geocast

He proposed the idea of Geocast which would deliver information to a group of destinations in a network identified by their geographical locations. He proposed applications such as geographic messaging, geographic advertising, delivery of geographically restricted services, and presence discovery of a service or mobile network participant in a limited geographic area.

Patents

Overall, Imieliński has published over 150 papers, his papers have been cited over 44000 times. He is an inventor and co-inventor on multiple patents ranging from search technology to web data extraction as well as multimedia processing, data mining, and mobile computing (e.g. patent on "Method and system for audio access to information in a wide area computer network").

Other Interests

Tomasz Imieliński formed, in 2000, System Crash, an avant-garde rock group which combined heavy sound with philosophical and political lyrics and multimedia projection of videos and sounds of current world, real and virtual. System Crash consisted of three musicians Tomasz Imielinski vocal and guitar, James Jeude] (bass) and Tomek Unrat (drums). Since January 2006, the band had also gone by the name of "The Professor and System Crash", the band title used on their 2006 re-printing of their 2005 CD "War By Remote Control". Internity, the first show of System Crash, focused on the internet revolution and its philosophical consequences – interplay between the virtual and real world, anthropomorphization of machines, programs and files. All lyrics were written by Tomasz Imieliński. The group stopped performing around 2007.

== Other selected publications ==
- Imieliński, T.; Badrinath, B.R. (Oct 1994). "Mobile wireless computing: challenges in data management". Communications of the ACM. 37 (10): 18–28. doi:10.1145/194313.194317. S2CID 20233082.
- T. Imielinski; H.F. Korth (Eds.) (1996). Mobile Computing. The Springer International Series in Engineering and Computer Science. Springer. ISBN 9780792396970.
- Imieliński, T.; Viswanathan, S.; Badrinath, B.R. (May–June 1997). "Data on Air: Organization and Access" (PDF). IEEE Transactions on Knowledge and Data Engineering. 9 (3): 353–372. CiteSeerX 10.1.1.569.2573. doi:10.1109/69.599926. Archived from the original (PDF) on 2006-02-05.
- Agrawal, R.; Imieliński, T.; Swami, A. (1993). "Database mining: A performance perspective" (PDF). IEEE Transactions on Knowledge and Data Engineering. 5 (6): 914–925. CiteSeerX 10.1.1.41.6931. doi:10.1109/69.250074.
- Barbará, D.; Imieliński, T. (May 1994). "Sleepers and workaholics: caching strategies in mobile environments" (PDF). ACM SIGMOD Record. 23 (2): 1–12. doi:10.1145/191843.191844. S2CID 47410274. Archived from the original (PDF) on 2017-02-04.
- Imieliński, T.; Mannilla, H. (1996). "A database perspective on knowledge discovery" (PDF). Communications of the ACM. 39 (11): 58–64. doi:10.1145/240455.240472. S2CID 7530194. Archived from the original (PDF) on 2017-02-04.
- Viswanathan, S.; Imieliński, T. (May 1996). "Metropolitan area video-on-demand service using pyramid broadcasting" (PDF). Multimedia Systems. 4 (4): 197–208. doi:10.1007/s005300050023. S2CID 13906353.
- Imieliński, T.; Viswanathan, S.; Badrinath, B.R. (June 1992). "Energy efficient indexing on air". ACM SIGMOD Record. 23 (2): 25–36. CiteSeerX 10.1.1.419.9766. doi:10.1145/191843.191846.
- Agrawal, R.; Ghosh, S.; Imieliński, T.; Iyer, B.; Swami, A. (1992). "An interval classifier for database mining applications" (PDF). Proceedings of the 18th VLDB Conference. pp. 569–573.
- Viswanathan, S.; Imieliński, T. (March 1995). "Pyramid broadcasting for video-on-demand service". In Rodriguez, Arturo A; Maitan, Jacek (eds.). Multimedia Computing and Networking 1995. Proceedings of the SPIE. Vol. 2417. pp. 66–77. Bibcode:1995SPIE.2417...66V. CiteSeerX 10.1.1.52.7083. doi:10.1117/12.206080. S2CID 5723866.
- Goel, S.; Imieliński, T. (Oct 2001). "Prediction-based monitoring in sensor networks: taking lessons from MPEG" (PDF). ACM SIGCOMM Computer Communication Review. 31 (5): 82. doi:10.1145/1037107.1037117. S2CID 6088323.
- Virmani, A.; Imieliński, T. (Dec 1999). "MSQL: A query language for database mining" (PDF). Data Mining and Knowledge Discovery. 3 (4): 373–408. doi:10.1023/A:1009816913055. S2CID 18202423.
- Imieliński, T.; Badrinath, B.R. (1993). "Data management for mobile computing". ACM SIGMOD Record. 22 (1): 34–39. CiteSeerX 10.1.1.41.3863. doi:10.1145/156883.156888. S2CID 13934908.
