= Quadrem =

Mining-related eMarketplace project

Quadrem is a procurement support organization in the mining industry. It is an eMarketplace project launched in 2000 to support the purchasing process the mining industry. Quadrem is one of the few remaining eMarketplace projects still active, most likely because of its global approach and strong support by participating businesses. It plays an active role in the UNSPSC classification program and standardization of communication between suppliers and purchasers.

In 2011, Ariba bought Quadrem.

== History ==
Quadrem is a world wide procurement and strategic sourcing provider. It was created in October 2000 during a trend of eMarketplace creation. It originates from the mining industry. Founding members:

- Alcoa
- Anglo American
- Barrick Gold
- BHP Billiton
- Codelco
- De Beers
- Glencore
- Imerys
- Newmont
- Pechiney
- Penoles
- Phelps Dodge
- Rio Tinto
- Vale
- Votorantim Group
- WMC Resources
- Xstrata

From its origins, Quadrem focused on the international mining industry. Quadrem supports global procurement and strategic sourcing in remote areas, including in remote areas.

Quadrem participated in the development and support of the Electronic Commerce Code Management Association's (ECCMA) Open Technical Dictionary (eOTD) standard.

Since 2005, Quadrem has supported emerging market economies by providing portable e-procurement technology for local suppliers of mining industries in Africa.

In 2010, Ariba announced a definitive agreement to acquire Quadrem for $150 million.

== Activities ==
Quadrem diversified and works with companies in different sectors such as mining, consumer goods, utilities and in the public sector.

It aims to cover the entire source-to-procure-to-pay process for large organizations.

It offers Strategic sourcing via (software as a service) applications and services, focused on Procurement intelligence, Sourcing tools (quotes, auctions and contract management) and sourcing strategy.

It aids procurement via catalogue management, electronic purchasing, electronic invoicing and automated payment services.

It also consultancy on content services (content cleansing and organization), sourcing strategy (seminars, workshops, consultancy), technology advice for connectivity and minority empowerment.
