= McIlraith =

McIlraith is a surname of Gaelic Scottish origins 'Mac gille Riabhaich', meaning 'The son of the brindled man'.

Notable people with the surname include:

- George McIlraith (1908–1992), Canadian lawyer and politician
- Hugh McIlraith (19th century), New Zealand politician
- Sheila McIlraith, Canadian computer scientist

== See also ==
- Matt McIlwrick
- Revie
