= TUN (product standard) =

TUN is a Danish product standard numbering system identifying building materials, managed by Danish Timber & Building Merchants' Trade Organization (Trælasthandlerunionen). Currently more than 30,000 products are identified. TUN numbers are assigned to suppliers identifying products and therefore a product with several suppliers can have more than one TUN number. TUN numbers are currently being mapped against UNSPSC.

== See also ==
- ETIM (standard)
