= ECLS =

ECLS may refer to:

- Environmental Control and Life Support System, support system of crewed spacecraft
- Extracorporeal life support, extracorporeal membrane oxygenation

== See also ==
- eCl@ss
