= RNTD =

RNTD may refer to:

- Royal Navy Torpedo Depot, see Royal Naval Armaments Depot
- RosettaNet Technical Dictionary
