= Tunn =

Tunn is a surname. Notable people with the surname include:

- Michael Tunn (born 1974) is an Australian radio announcer and television presenter
- Susanne Tunn (born 1958) is a German sculptor

== See also ==
- Tun (disambiguation)
