= ETIM =

ETIM may refer to:

- East Turkestan independence movement, a political movement seeking an independent East Turkestan
- Turkistan Islamic Party, formerly known as the East Turkestan Islamic Movement, an Islamic extremist organization founded in Western China
- ETIM (standard), a classification system for electrical and electronic products
