= EOTD =

Online technical dictionary

eOTD is the acronym for the ECCMA Open Technical Dictionary. The dictionary is a language-independent database of concepts with associated terms, definitions and images used to unambiguously describe individuals, organizations, locations, goods, services, processes, rules, and regulations. The eOTD is maintained by the Electronic Commerce Code Management Association (ECCMA).

== History ==
The eOTD was developed with the support of the Defense Logistics Information Service (DLIS) an agency of the US Defense Logistics Agency (DLA). The eOTD is the first dictionary to be compliant with ISO 22745 (open technical dictionaries).

== Structure ==
The eOTD contains terms, definitions and images linked to concept identifiers. eOTD concept identifiers are used to create unambiguous language independent descriptions of individuals, organizations, locations, goods, services, processes, rules and regulations. The process of using concept identifiers from an external open technical dictionary is a form of semantic encoding compliant with the requirements of ISO 8000-110:2008, the international standard for the exchange of quality master data.

The eOTD concept identifiers are in the public domain. Using public domain identifiers as metadata creates portable data that can be legally separated from the software application that was used to create it. The dictionary contains concepts from international, national and industry standards including over 400,000 concepts of class (approved item name), property (attribute), units of measure, currency and common enumerated value (e.g., days of the week). The eOTD does not include a class hierarchy or class-property relationships.

== Use ==
Companies use the eOTD to create data requirement specifications as Identification Guides (IGs) or cataloging templates. These Identification Guides contain the class-property relationships and are used for cataloging, to measure data quality as well as to create requests for data or requests for data validation.

== Industrial products and services categorization standards ==
- eCl@ss
- ETIM (standard)
- UNSPSC
- eOTD
- RosettaNet

== See also ==
- Ontology (information science)
