= Product classification =

Classification of goods and services

Product classification or product taxonomy is a type of economic taxonomy which organizes products for a variety of purposes. However, not only products can be referred to in a standardized way but also sales practices in form of the “Incoterms” and industries can be classified into categories.

Some standard product classifications include:

- CPA — Classification of Products by Activity, a product nomenclature that was used in the European Economic Community and now in use in the EU, a European version of the CPC
  - CPA 1996
  - CPA 2002
  - CPA 2008
  - CPA 2.1
- CPC — Central Product Classification, a United Nations standard classification for products
- ETIM, the ETIM Technical Information Model
- Global Classification and Harmonized Schedule Numbers for customs classification
- HS — Harmonized Commodity Description and Coding System
- SITC — Standard International Trade Classification
- Trade in Services
- UNSPSC, the United Nations Standard Products and Services Code
- IEC Common Data Dictionary (IEC CDD), a product classification and product description based on international standards and defined by the International Electrotechnical Commission
- eCl@ss, a global and ISO/IEC-conform system for classification and description of products and services, maintained by the non-governmental eCl@ss e.V. association

== See also ==
- Industry classification
