= IEC 61360 =

International standard for data element definitions.

IEC 61360, with the title "Standard data element types with associated classification scheme", is a series of standard documents defining a general purpose vocabulary in terms of a reference dictionary published by the International Electrotechnical Commission.

== Intended use ==
The vocabulary specified in IEC 61360 may be used to define ontologies for use in the field of electrotechnology, electronics and related domains.

== Structure ==
The IEC 61360 series is structured into different parts:

- IEC 61360-1 - Part 1: Definitions - Principles and methods
- IEC 61360-2 - Part 2: EXPRESS dictionary schema
- IEC 61360-4 - Part 4: IEC Common Data Dictionary (IEC CDD)
- IEC 61360-6 - Part 6: IEC Common Data Dictionary (IEC CDD) quality guidelines

IEC 61360-1 provides a detailed introduction to the structure of the dictionary and its use. IEC 61360-2 specifies the detailed dictionary data model and IEC 61360-6 stipulates quality criteria for the content of the dictionary. The data model defined in IEC 61360-2 is also published in ISO 13584-42.

The IEC provides a technical dictionary for the use in the electro-technical and electronic domain which is published as IEC 61360-4. This dictionary is called IEC Common Data Dictionary (IEC CDD) and can be accessed as a web page (https://cdd.iec.ch).

== See also ==
IEC 61360 also defines the base for other product taxonomies like eCl@ss.

Industrie 4.0 uses product property description based on IEC 61360.

- "IEC 61360" at International Electrotechnical Commission
