= Web Services Modeling Language =

WSML or Web Service Modeling Language is a formal language that provides a syntax and semantics for the Web Service Modeling Ontology (WSMO).

In other words, the WSML provides means to formally describe the WSMO elements as Ontologies, Semantic Web services, Goals, and Mediators.

The WSML is based on the logical formalisms as Description Logic, First-order Logic and Logic Programming.

== Language variants of WSML ==
- WSML Core, defined as an intersection of the Description Logic and Horn Logic. Supports modeling classes, attributes, binary relations and instances.
- WSML-DL, extension of the WSML Core, fully captures the Description Logic $\mathcal{SHIQ}^\mathcal{(D)}$.
- WSML-Flight, extension of the WSML Core, provides features as meta-modeling, constraints and nonmonotonic negation.
- WSML-Rule, extension of the WSML-Flight, provides Logic Programming capabilities.
- WSML-Full, a unification of the WSML-DL and WSML-Rule.

== See also ==
- Ontology (computer science)
- Semantic Web
- Semantic Web Services
- Web Ontology Language (OWL), OWL-S, WSDL
- WSMO
