= DDPO =

DDPO may refer to:

- Defense Dissemination Program Office, see National Geospatial-Intelligence Agency
- DDPO, a Tehsil management office, see Sambrial
- Dolce+DnS Plan Ontology, see process ontology
