= Abiding Geocast / Stored Geocast =

Geocast routing scheme

Abiding geocast is a time stable geocast scheme used in some ad hoc wireless networks. It is not applicable to Internet routing. Messages are delivered to all nodes that are inside a destination region within a certain period of time. In contrast to an ordinary geocast, which is delivered to all nodes which are inside a destination region exactly at the time of sending plus distribution delay in the network, abiding geocast allows senders to define a lifetime for the geocast message.

Abiding geocast is created by the retransmission of the geocast message, either periodically to the destination region or whenever a node inside the destination region detects a new neighbor.

New services and applications such as position-based advertising, position-based publish and subscribe use abiding geocast. Abiding geocast could enable the creation of virtual traffic signs such as local hazard warnings. For example, an abiding geocast fixed to a certain geographical area could warn approaching vehicles about an icy road.

== See also ==
- Geocast
