= Classification of Types of Construction =

The Classification of types of construction (CC), is a nomenclature for the classification of constructions (i.e. buildings) according to their type. It is based on the CPC that was published by the United Nations in 1991. Its final version was approved in 1997.

The decimal system classification - each type is qualified by a four-digit number - comprises:

1. 2 Sections (1-digit) - Buildings, Civil engineering works
2. 6 Divisions (2-digit)
3. 20 Groups (3-digit)
4. 46 Classes (4-digit)

The CC is a "standard that must be taken into account in recording, collecting, processing, analysing, transmitting and disseminating data on construction works for statistical and record-keeping purposes" in various European countries and Eurostat.

The classification of types of construction should not be confused with the 16 Divisions or 50 Divisions, which separates construction projects by specifications and trade.
