= Tun =

TUN or tun may refer to:

== Biology ==
- Tun shells, large sea snails of the family Tonnidae
- Tun, a tardigrade in its cryptobiotic state
- Tun or Toon, common name for trees of the genus Toona

== Places ==
- Tun, Sweden, a locality in Västra Götaland County
- Tūn or Toon, the former name of Ferdows, a city in Iran
- Touro University Nevada, a private university in Henderson, Nevada, United States
- Tunisia, ISO 3166-1 alpha-3 country code
- Tunis–Carthage International Airport, (IATA airport code: TUN)
- Old English meaning town. Often used as a suffix in its Romanised form (~ton) e.g.: Southampton

== Measurement and time ==
- Tun (Maya calendar), a unit of 360 days on the Maya calendar
- Tun (unit), an antiquated measurement of liquid

== Science and technology ==
- TUN/TAP, a computer network device driver
- TUN (product standard), Danish building materials numbering system

== Other uses ==
- Brilliance Tun, a 2014–2015 Chinese city car
- Tun, an honorific Malay title
- Tun, a type of cask (barrel) with a capacity of 252 wine gallons (954 litres)
  - Lauter tun, a vessel used in brewing
  - Mash tun, a vessel used in brewing

== See also ==
- Ton (disambiguation)
