= Geocast =

Sending a message to all computers on a network in a geographic location

Geocast refers to the delivery of information to a subset of destinations in a wireless peer-to-peer network identified by their geographical locations. It is used by some mobile ad hoc network routing protocols, but not applicable to Internet routing.

== Geographic addressing ==
Routing schemes
Unicast

Broadcast

Multicast

Anycast

A geographic destination address is expressed in three ways: point, circle (with center point and radius), and polygon (a list of points, e.g., P(1), P(2), ..., P(n–1), P(n)). A geographic router (Geo Router) calculates its service area (geographic area it serves) as the union of the geographic areas covered by the networks attached to it. This service area is approximated by a single closed polygon. Geo Routers exchange service area polygons to build routing tables. The routers are organized in a hierarchy.

== Applications ==
Geographic addressing and routing has many potential applications in geographic messaging, geographic advertising, delivery of geographically restricted services, and presence discovery of a service or mobile network participant in a limited geographic area (see Navas, Imieliński, 'GeoCast - Geographic Addressing and Routing'.)

== See also ==
- Abiding Geocast / Stored Geocast
