= Victor W. Marek =

Polish mathematician and computer scientist

Victor Witold Marek, formerly Wiktor Witold Marek known as Witek Marek (born 22 March 1943) is a Polish mathematician and computer scientist working in the fields of theoretical computer science and mathematical logic.

== Biography ==
Victor Witold Marek studied mathematics at the Faculty of Mathematics and Physics of the University of Warsaw. Supervised by Andrzej Mostowski, he received both a magister degree in mathematics in 1964 and a doctoral degree in mathematics in 1968. He completed habilitation in mathematics in 1972.

In 1970–1971, Marek was a postdoctoral researcher at Utrecht University, the Netherlands, where he worked under Dirk van Dalen. In 1967–1968 as well as in 1973–1975, he was a researcher at the Institute of Mathematics of the Polish Academy of Sciences, Warsaw, Poland. In 1979–1980 and 1982–1983 he worked at the Venezuelan Institute of Scientific Research. In 1976, he was appointed an assistant professor of mathematics at the University of Warsaw.

In 1983, he was appointed a professor of computer science at the University of Kentucky, where he retired in 2018. In 1989–1990, he was a visiting professor of mathematics at Cornell University, Ithaca, New York. In 2001–2002, he was a visitor at the Department of Mathematics of the University of California, San Diego.

In 2013, Professor Marek was the Chair of the Program Committee of the scientific conference commemorating Andrzej Mostowski's Centennial.

== Legacy ==
=== Teaching ===
He has supervised a number of graduate theses and projects. He was an advisor of 16 doctoral candidates both in mathematics and computer science. In particular, he advised dissertations in mathematics by Małgorzata Dubiel-Lachlan, Roman Kossak, Adam Krawczyk, Tadeusz Kreid, Roman Murawski, Andrzej Pelc, Zygmunt Ratajczyk, Marian Srebrny, and Zygmunt Vetulani. In computer science his students were V. K. Cody Bumgardner, Waldemar W. Koczkodaj, Witold Lipski, Joseph Oldham, Inna Pivkina, Michał Sobolewski , Paweł Traczyk, and Zygmunt Vetulani. These individuals have worked in various institutions of higher education in Canada, France, Poland, and the United States.

=== Mathematics ===
He investigated a number of areas in the foundations of mathematics, for instance infinitary combinatorics (large cardinals), metamathematics of set theory, the hierarchy of constructible sets, models of second-order arithmetic, the impredicative theory of Kelley–Morse classes. He proved that the so-called Fraïssé conjecture (second-order theories of countable ordinals are all different) is entailed by Gödel's axiom of constructibility. Together with Marian Srebrny, he investigated properties of gaps in a constructible universe.

=== Computer science ===
He studied logical foundations of computer science. In the early 1970s, in collaboration with Zdzisław Pawlak, he investigated Pawlak's information storage and retrieval systems, which then was a widely studied concept, especially in Eastern Europe. These systems were essentially single-table relational databases, but unlike Codd's relational databases were bags rather than sets of records. These investigations, in turn, led Pawlak to the concept of rough set, studied by Marek and Pawlak in 1981. The concept of rough set, in computer science, statistics, topology, universal algebra, combinatorics, and modal logic, turned out to be an expressive language for describing, and especially manipulating an incomplete information.

=== Logic ===
In the area of nonmonotonic logics, a group of logics related to artificial intelligence, he focused on investigations of Reiter's default logic, and autoepistemic logic of R. Moore. These investigations led to a form of logic programming called answer set programming a computational knowledge representation formalism, studied both in Europe and in the United States. Together with Mirosław Truszczynski, he proved that the problem of existence of stable models of logic programs is NP-complete. In a stronger formalism admitting function symbols, along with Nerode and Remmel he showed that the analogous problem is Σ^{1}_{1}-complete.

== Publications ==
V. W. Marek is an author of over 180 scientific papers in the area of foundations of mathematics and of computer science. He was also an editor of numerous proceedings of scientific meetings. Additionally, he authored or coauthored several books. These include:

- Logika i Podstawy Matematyki w Zadaniach (jointly with Janusz Onyszkiewicz)
- Logic and Foundations of Mathematics in problems (jointly with Janusz Onyszkiewicz)
- Analiza Kombinatoryczna (jointly with W. Lipski),
- Nonmonotonic Logic – Context-dependent Reasoning (jointly with M. Truszczyński),
- Introduction to Mathematics of Satisfiability.
