= Revie =

Revie is a surname and given name. Notable people with the name include:

Surname

- Don Revie (1927–1989), British football player and manager
- Gillian Revie, British ballerina
- Jack Revie (fl. 1930), Australian football coach
- Jimmy Revie (born 1947), British boxer

Given name

- Revie Sorey (born 1953) American football player
