= RosettaNet =

Non-profit business consortium

- Formation: 1998
- Type: Non-profit consortium
- Headquarters: United States
- Region served: Worldwide
- Members: 500 companies
- Key people: Fadi Chehade (founding CEO)
- Parent organization: GS1 US

RosettaNet is a non-profit consortium aimed at establishing standard processes for the sharing of business information (B2B). RosettaNet is a consortium of major Computer and Consumer Electronics, Electronic Components, Semiconductor Manufacturing, Telecommunications and Logistics companies working to create and implement industry-wide, open e-business process standards. These standards form a common e-business language, aligning processes between supply chain partners on a global basis.

== Overview ==
RosettaNet is a subsidiary of GS1 US, formerly the Uniform Code Council, Inc. (UCC). It was formed mainly through the efforts of Fadi Chehade, its first CEO. RosettaNet's 500 members come from companies around the world. The consortium has a presence in USA, Malaysia, Europe, Japan, Taiwan, China, Singapore, Thailand and Australia. RosettaNet has several local user groups. The European User Group is called EDIFICE.

The RosettaNet Standards website shut down by the end of 2013 and RosettaNet Standards is now managed as part of GS1 US website.

== The RosettaNet standard ==
The RosettaNet standard defines both e-commerce document and exchange protocols, as part of the Electronic data interchange (EDI).

The RosettaNet standard is based on XML and defines message guidelines, interfaces for business processes, and implementation frameworks for interactions between companies. Mostly addressed is the supply chain area, but also manufacturing, product and material data and service processes are in scope.

The standard is widely spread in the global semiconductor industry, but also in electronic components, consumer electronics, telecommunication and logistics. RosettaNet originated in the USA and is widely used there, but it is also well accepted and even supported by governments in Asia. Due to the widespread use of EDIFACT in Europe, RosettaNet is used less, but it is growing.

The RosettaNet Automated Enablement standard (RAE) uses the Office Open XML document standard.

The RosettaNet Technical Dictionary (RNTD) is the reference model for the classification and characterization of the products in the supply chains that use RosettaNet for their interactions.

== Industrial products standards ==
- ECLASS
- ETIM
- UNSPSC
- eOTD
- SWIFT
- RosettaNet

== See also ==
- ebXML
- Electronic Data Interchange
- Office Open XML software
