= Waldemar W. Koczkodaj =

Polish-American computer scientist (born 1951)

- Born: June 7, 1951 (age 75); Lubartów, Poland
- Education: Institute of Computer Science, Polish Academy of Sciences (PhD); Warsaw University of Technology (BE/MEng)
- Scientific career
- Fields: Computer Science; Bioinformatics; Human Computer Interaction; Data Mining; Decision Making
- Workplaces: Laurentian University
- Doctoral advisor: Victor W. Marek

Waldemar Koczkodaj (born June 7, 1951 in Lubartów, Poland), is a Polish-Canadian computer scientist specialized in expert systems, assessments by pairwise comparisons method, inconsistency theory, bioinformatics, rating scale improvement, and behavioral addiction. He is known for the introduction of the inconsistency indicator (known as Kii) for pairwise comparisons. He proposed axiomatization for the inconsistency indicator in 2014 (published with Ryszard Szwarc and enhanced it in 2018 (published with Roman Urban).

== Biography ==
Waldemar Koczkodaj graduated from the Warsaw University of Technology in 1975. Koczkodaj received the doctoral degree in 1980, from the Institute of Computer Science, Polish Academy of Sciences for the connection of rough sets to databases, under supervision of Victor W. Marek.

Since 1985, he has been working at Laurentian University in Canada. He collaborates with numerous research centres, in Canada, Poland, United States, China, Great Britain, France, Hungary, Turkey, Kuwait, Saudi Arabia, and Australia. Koczkodaj proposed an automatic data-driven method for the reduction of rating scales.

In 2018, he coordinated a research effort to analyze health record breaches, based on data posted by U.S. Department of Health and Human Services Office for Civil Rights. The total number of individuals affected (called NIA by the government but they are simply patients) in the health care system was 173,398,820 at the time of publication submission (2017).

== Legacy ==
=== COVID-19 One Million Cases Early Prediction ===
He has coordinated a research effort on three continents to predict the day of one million cases of COVID-19 pandemic. One of these research effort members was P.F. Zabrodsky, the Chief Radiologist during the elimination of the consequences of the Chernobyl accident.

=== Rating Scale Reduction ===
Koczkodaj has coordinated an international research effort for a rating scale reduction by a data-driven method proposed by him. It is based on the area under the receiver operating characteristic.

=== Industrial Applications ===
In partnership with mining officials of the Ontario Ministry of Northern Development and Mines in the 1990s, Koczkodaj oversaw the development of the Abandoned Mines Information System (AMIS). This system became the cornerstone of the Ontario Government's multi-million dollar/multiyear campaign to deal with the clean-up of abandoned mines throughout the Province. Now into its third decade, AMIS is internationally recognized and available on an interactive government website. Koczkodaj also applied the use of the Pairwise Comparisons Method to create the Abandoned Mine Hazards Rating System (AMHAZ), an expert system for the Ontario Government to prioritize funding for the clean-up and reclamation of abandoned mine sites. This concept was presented at the 10th National Meeting of the American Society of Surface Mining, and Reclamation, Spokane Washington, and again in Jackson Wyoming at the invitation of the Association Abandoned Mine Lands Programs.

=== Teaching and Academic Service ===
Waldemar W. Koczkodaj has been a faculty member at Universities on three continents:

- Warsaw University of Technology, Poland (Europe),
- Kuwait University, Kuwait (Asia),
- Laurentian University, Canada (North America).

He currently serves (as an editor or a member of the editorial board) for the following journals:

- Journal of Computational Science,
- Vietnam Journal of Computer Science,
- Journal of Applied Mathematics and Computational Mechanics.

His past editorial assignments included:

- IEEE Access (Associate Editor of the month, March 2016,
- International Journal of Software Engineering and Knowledge Engineering.

== Publications ==
Waldemar W. Koczkodaj is the author of numerous publications in the area of pairwise comparisons method. Some of his considerable importance publications include:

- A new definition of consistency of pairwise comparisons.
- A Monte Carlo Study of Pairwise Comparison.
- On Axiomatization of Inconsistency Indicators for Pairwise Comparisons.
- Generalization of a new definition of consistency for pairwise comparisons.
