= Global Classification =

Global Classification is the process of classifying products for the purpose of complying with customs authorities, qualifying for free trade agreements and filing entries to customs during the importation or exportation of those products. A slight difference in classification can mean a huge difference in the duties that are paid.

Classification data includes:

- Harmonized Schedule Numbers
- Special tariff preference programs
- Product descriptions and pictures
- Schematics
- Material Safety Data Sheets (MSDS)
- Toxic Substance Control Act (TSCA) documentation
- Country of origin credentials
- Value Information

With the growing complexity of supply chains as well as the increasing number of government regulations around importing and exporting, companies are realizing the need to proactively manage trade compliance data in order to minimize risk, such as the inaccurate classification of data. Providing classification data on imported and exported products is required, regardless of an organization's global location and classifying products is typically a manual and time-consuming process. Companies need to establish data management standards to help reduce inaccurate classification, strengthen the exchange of data between trading partners, and provide version control in order to track all changes that take place.

== Automation ==
With an automated Global Classification solution, companies can collect, store, and access classification data in one centralized located at both a global level using the World Customs Organization (WCO) 6-digit Harmonized Schedule Numbers and with multiple country specific views tailored to the country of interest. As a result, the centrally controlled classification database reduces errors, increases internal and external communication, strengthens compliance, and improves the timeliness of the information shared with external trading partners. Using an automated solution, companies can:

- Set up an approval process to ensure data integrity
- Perform mass updates for easy maintenance of product data such as Harmonized Tariff updates
- Reduce time and resources spent on managing product classifications and related data
- Eliminate duplicate data entry through interfaces with inventory processing systems
- Manage key classification data required by various countries
- Link to other government agencies to receive product updates
- Store binding rulings

More than just a product classification database, an automated Global Classification solution allows companies to manage a global database that includes all forms of data, increasing visibility into changes such as additions or deletions of classification data. Organizations will also improve compliance across the supply chain. Providing on-demand availability to the classification database, via the web, ensures that every trading partner has access to and uses the same classification data at every stage in the supply chain, minimizing risks and/or delays or possible fees from Customs. With an automated solution, companies will have everything they need to manage global trade management throughout the organization captured in a consolidated relational database.
