= Central Product Classification =

Regulatory Agency

The Central Product Classification (CPC) is a product classification for goods and services promulgated by the United Nations Statistical Commission. It is intended to be an international standard for organizing and analyzing data on industrial production, national accounts, trade, prices and so on.

The European Union's Classification of Products by Activity (CPA) is based on CPC.

== See also ==
- Classification of Types of Construction
