= Electronic Commerce Code Management Association =

The Code Management Association (US-DE.BER:3031657) trading as the Electronic Commerce Code Management Association (ECCMA) is an international not for profit membership association founded in 1999 with the mission to champion the development and adoption of international standards for quality, interoperable supply chain data. The Association states that it works through collaborative efforts among industry and government to enhance data & information accuracy and reduce costs associated with identifying and describing individuals, organizations, locations, goods, and services within business systems worldwide. It has membership tiers for companies and individuals. It provides training and certification relating to international standards for supply chain data.

The Association first developed the United Nations Standard Products and Services Code (UNSPSC) as a global commodity classification and went on to develop the ECCMA Open Technical Dictionary (eOTD). These initiatives allowed the creation and exchange of unambiguous, language independent master data, data that identifies and describes individuals, organizations, locations, goods, services, processes, rules and regulations. The eOTD is based on the Federal Cataloging System and the NATO Codification System, the systems used to manage the world's largest shared inventory developed by the Department of Defense and members of NATO and used today in over 50 countries.

ECCMA is the project leader for ISO 22745 (Open technical dictionaries and their application to master data). It also leads projects for developing sections of ISO 8000 (Data quality) and ISO 25500 (Supply chain interoperability and integration). These standards ensure data quality, and facilitate the exchange of material and service master data. They support the interoperability and integration of supply chains.

ECCMA is the American National Standards Institute (ANSI) accredited administrator of the US technical advisory group (US TAG) to ISO Technical Committee 184 Sub Committee 4 (ISO TC 184/SC 4), a leading ISO technical committee responsible for the development and maintenance of international standards for industrial data.

ECCMA is a Type A Liaison organization to ISO TC 184/SC 4. ECCMA provides its members with ISO 8000 Digital Supply Chain Solutions:

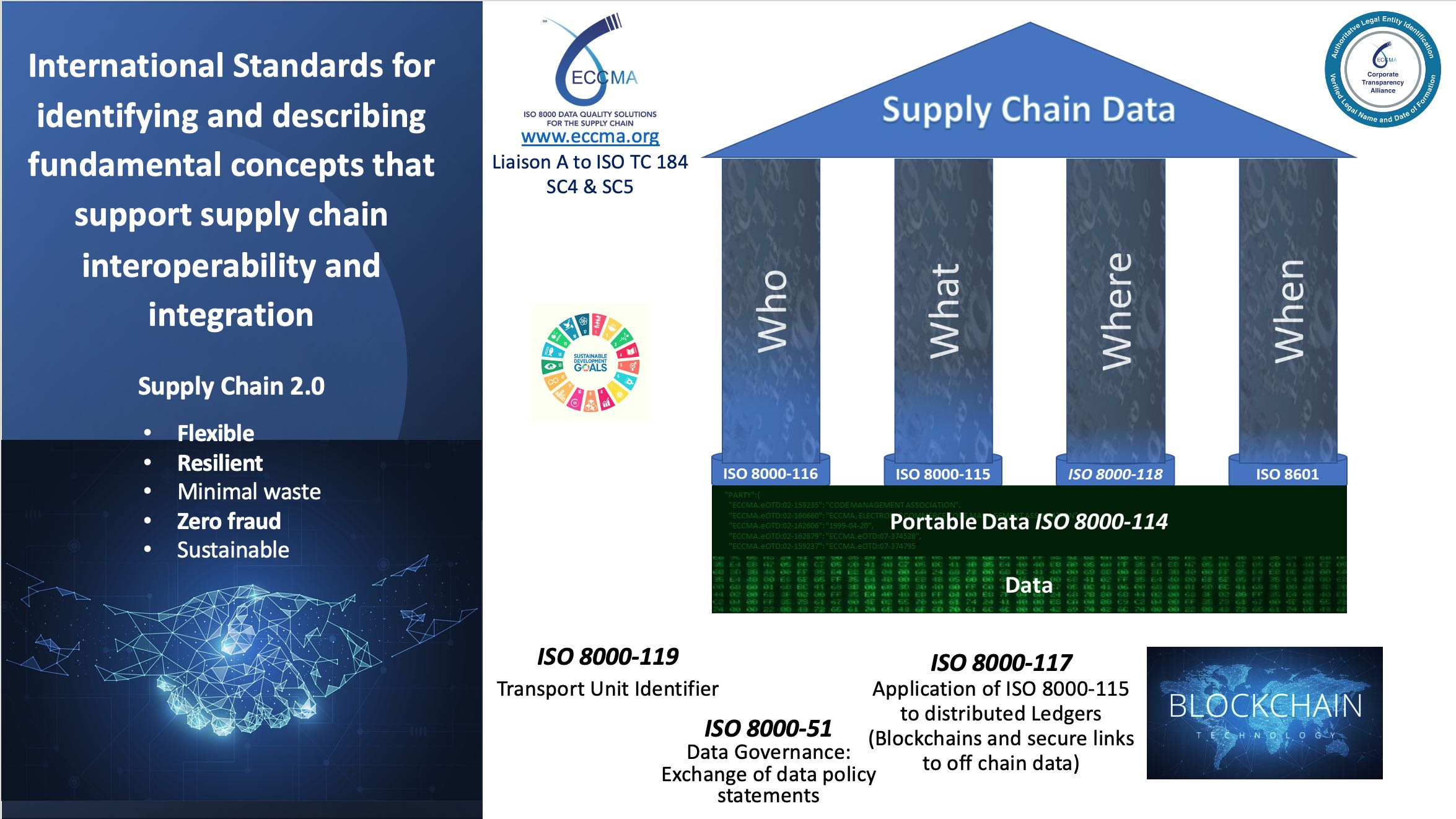
International Standards for Supply Chain Data

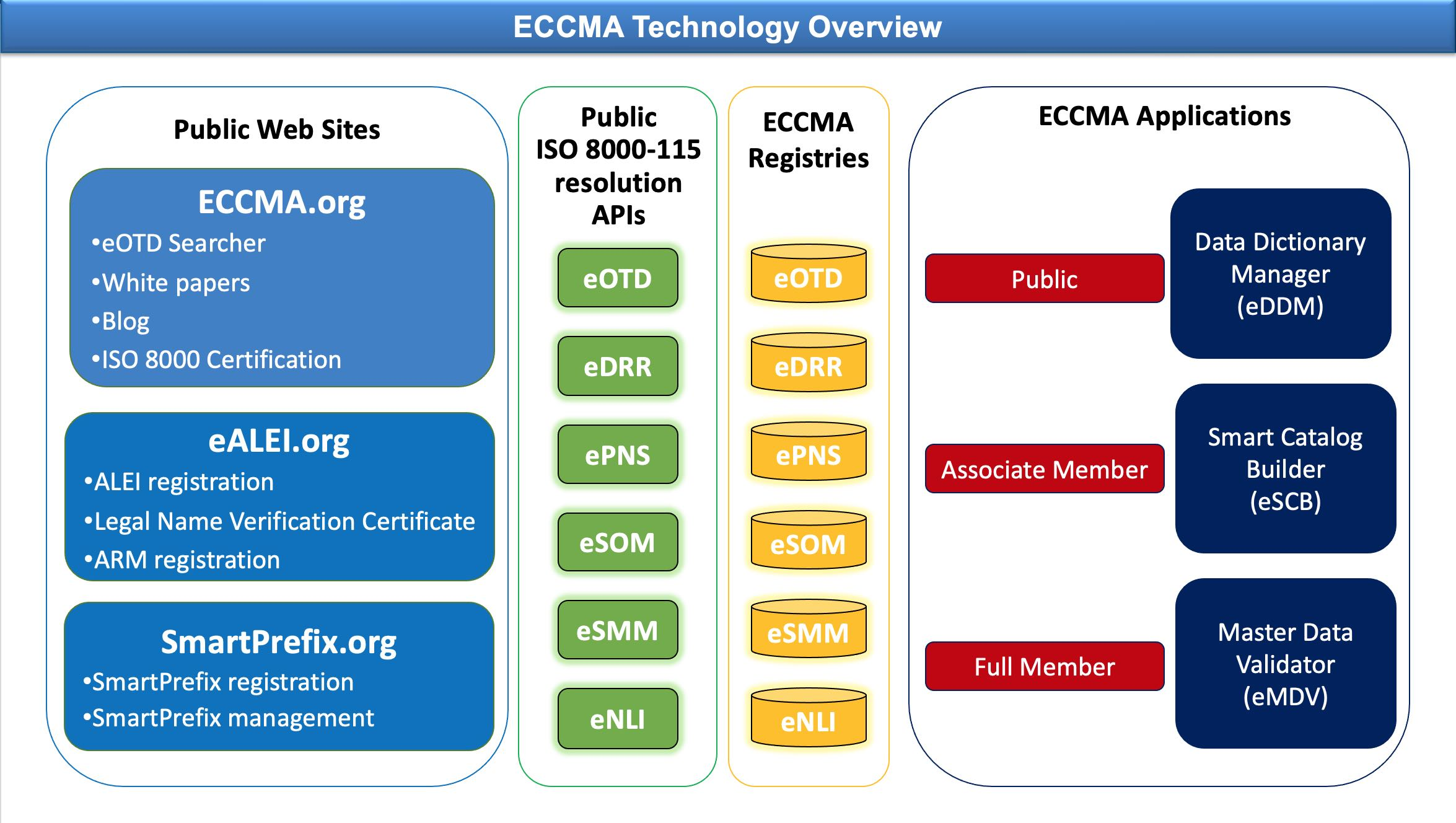
ECCMA technology overview

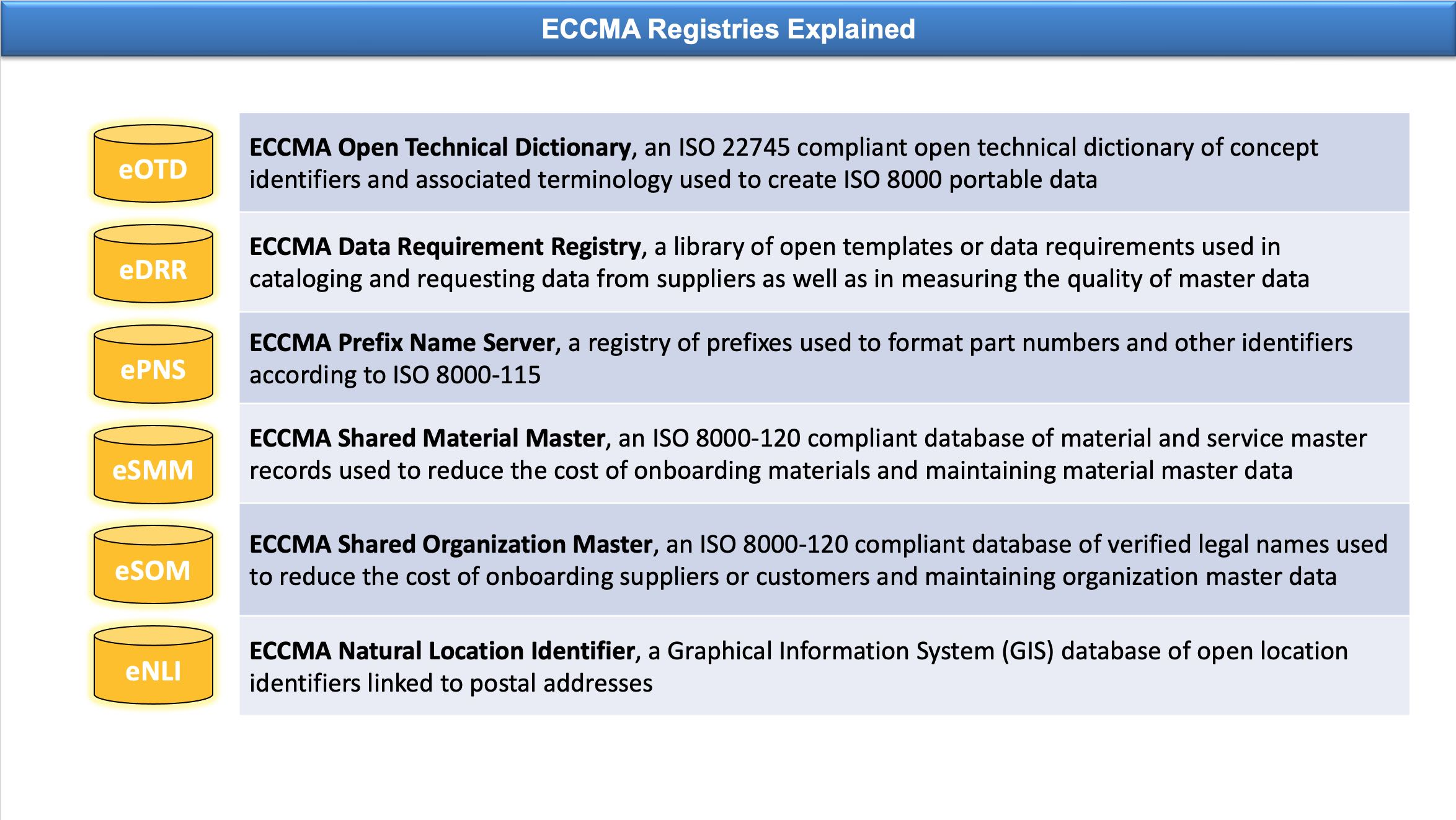
