= IEC Common Data Dictionary =

IEC Common Data Dictionary (abbreviated: IEC CDD) is a metadata registry providing product classification and formalized product descriptions that can be used in the context of smart manufacturing and Industrie 4.0.

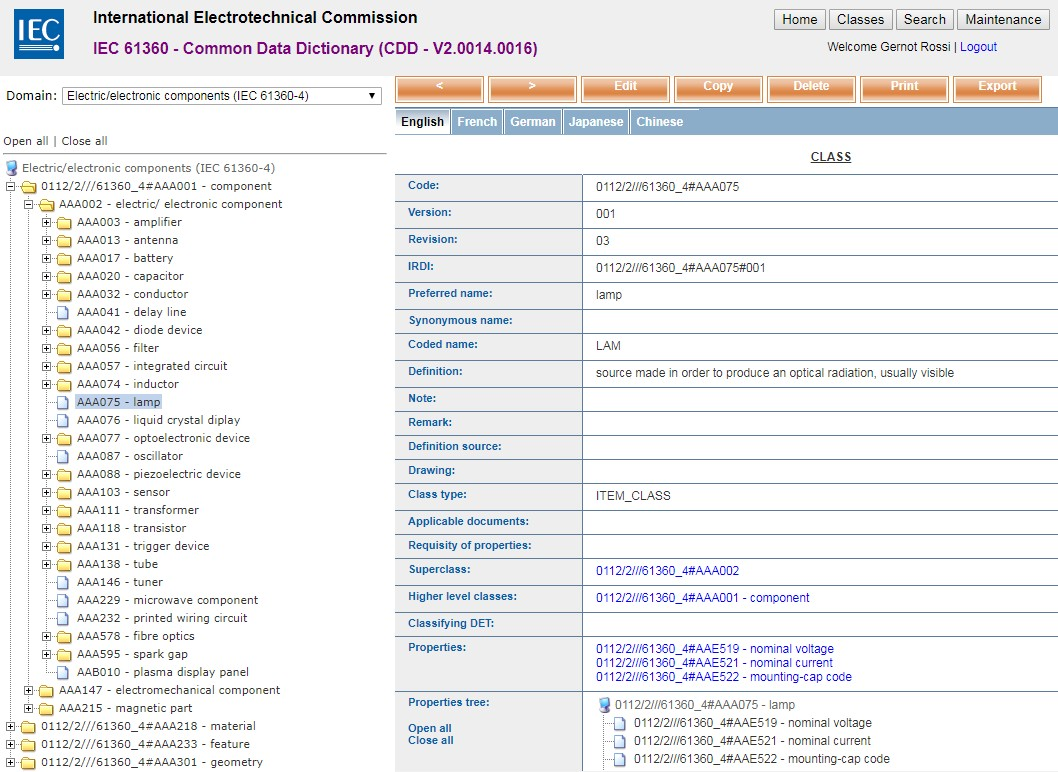
Overview page of IEC Common Data Dictionary, providing the classification tree for one domain and the description of the selected class.

== Data Model ==
IEC CDD is based on the data model defined in IEC 61360-2/ISO 13584–42 with an enhancement of its modelling capability adopted from IEC 62656-1. The description of the data model for dictionary developers in particular for those in electrotechnical domains is given in IEC 61360-1. Currently the scope of the registry is extended to cover all ISO and IEC domains, thus it is no longer "IEC CDD", nevertheless it is hosted by IEC-CO and is maintained by IEC SC 3D with a joint working group formed between IEC SC 3D and ISO TC 184/SC4. The data model of the CDD references ISO/IEC 11179 for the identification of the registered elements . It is used to host product classifications. - This means the IEC CDD is a database providing classifications and metadata definitions for describing products. The IEC CDD is an International Standard in the form of an online database, not in the form of (e-)paper, and is given the standard number IEC 61360-4 DB. Thus the metadata registered into the database has the status of International Standard. The procedure to add a new definition or a set of definitions is based on the IEC database procedure, described in Annex SL of the IEC supplementary of the ISO/IEC directive Part 1. This process for updating the content is called a "Change Request" and when a Change Request is issued and adopted, the proposed item will become part of the International Standard, IEC 61360-4 DB, within approximately 6 months.

== Use ==
IEC CDD originally was intended to support electronic exchange of digital information (e.g. for e-commerce).

The exchanged information is based on concepts, which are standardized as a common basis.

New information concepts related to smart manufacturing and Industrie 4.0 are based on use of IEC CDD and similar dictionaries. The intention for these use cases is to provide the meaning of data values by referencing the data definitions in the dictionaries. Such annotated data values then can be exchanged within one production system between machines of different manufacturers or between different companies.

== Scope ==
The data specification for IEC CDD is provided by IEC 61360. This means IEC CDD stores concepts which are based on IEC 61360, such as

- Uniquely identified classes and properties, and their relations;
- Uniquely identified values and value lists;
- terminology and definitions based on accepted international standards;
- technical representation of concepts including units and data types and their identification.

The representation of a product and its features is based on a hierarchy of classes. The characteristics of the product are represented with help of the property definitions related to the classes. Such property definitions may be based on general datatypes or based on specific values and value lists (e.g. for defining a supported range). Each class and each property may be defined with name and textual descriptions in multiple languages.

Such a definition for a property representation can be used as base for product descriptions in e-catalogues or for B2B communications (see B2B e-commerce).

== Content ==
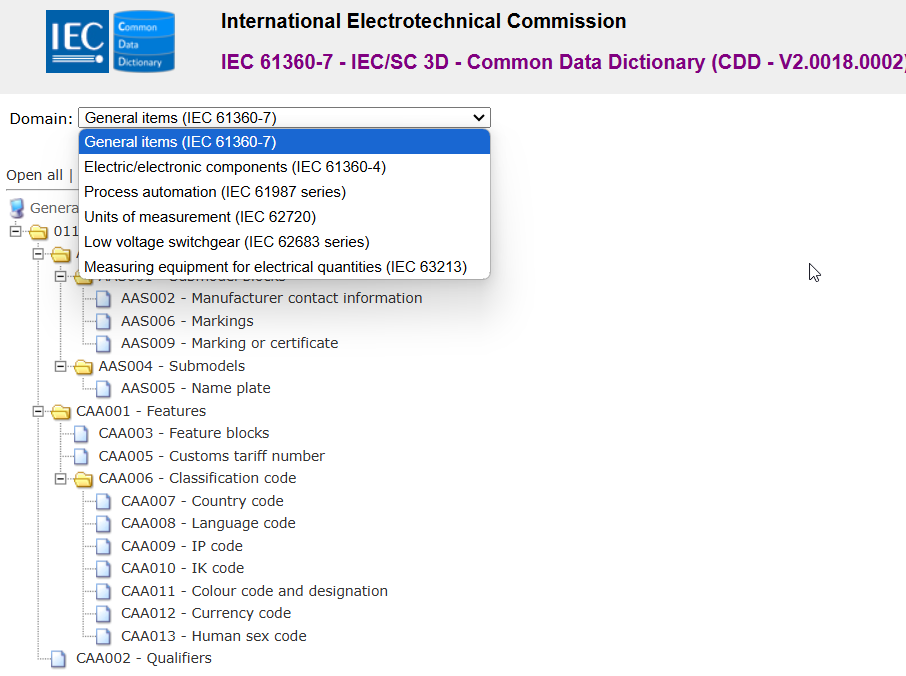
Selection of domain and Hierarchy of items. (Shows the currently publicly available domains.)

The IEC CDD is organized into different domains, each domain providing one of these product classifications. Each of these domains can be accessed directly using the HTML user interface of IEC CDD, and there is hierarchical browsing.

The IEC CDD is freely available at https://cdd.iec.ch. It identifiers items by IRDI. Items are cross-linked with each other, within and across standards. For example:

- 0112/2///62720#UAA609 kilogram per hour bar is a Unit of measure
- It applies to these Quantity kinds (lists of compatible units):
  - 0112/2///61987#ABT544 Mass flow rate per pressure (defined in IEC 61987 on Process automation equipment).
  - 0112/2///62720#UAD220 variation of mass flow rate due to pressure
- It applies to the following product properties (both defined in IEC 61987 on Process automation equipment):
  - 0112/2///61987#ABB818 maximum influence of process pressure on mass flow
  - 0112/2///61987#ABB817 average influence of process pressure on mass flow

IEC CDD hosts different product classifications and properties, based on international standards:

- process automation equipment (based on IEC 61987),
- low voltage switchgear and controlgear (based on IEC 62683),
- electro-electronic components (provided by IEC TC47),
- optics (based on ISO 23584, test (Note: Ontologies marked with 'test' have restricted access only.)),
- measuring instruments (based on IEC ISO 13584-501, test),
- environmental declaration (based on IEC 60721, test).
- Units of measure and Quantity kinds (based on IEC 62720), referenced by product properties.

== Procedure to introduce new information into IEC CDD ==
The procedure to integrate new concepts is defined by "ISO/IEC directives supplement – Procedures specific to IEC", Annex SL. In order to provide new content or improvement of the content of IEC CDD, a Change Request (CR) may be submitted to IEC SC3D. The CR is reviewed by SC3D experts for syntactic correctness and completeness. After that, during Evaluation stage the CR will be checked for correctness of formal definitions according to the definition rules as defined by ISO/IEC directives Part 2, as well as syntactic and semantic consistency. After these checks the CR is voted to reach Validation stage.
