= DAML-S =

The DARPA agent markup language for services (DAML-S) is a semantic markup language for describing web services and related ontologies.

DAML-S is built on top of DAML+OIL.

DAML-S has been superseded by OWL-S.
