= ISO/TC 184/SC 4 =

International standards organization

ISO/TC 184/SC 4 is an international standards organization responsible for industrial data. ISO/TC 184/SC 4 develops and maintains ISO standards that describe and manage industrial product data throughout the life of the product. ISO/TC 184/SC 4, Industrial data, is Subcommittee 4 of ISO/TC 184, Automation systems and integration, which is Technical Committee 184 of the International Organization for Standardization (ISO). Participating member nations of the Subcommittee represent 80% of world GDP.

== Example standards ==
ISO/TC 184/SC 4 has direct responsibility for many standards and projects. Some examples:

- ISO 8000, Data quality
- ISO 25500 Supply chain interoperability and integration
- ISO/PAS 8329, Extended master connection file (χMCF) — Description of mechanical connections and joints in structural systems
- ISO 10303, Industrial automation systems and integration — Product data representation and exchange, informally known as Standard for the Exchange of Product Model Data (STEP)
- ISO 13584, Industrial automation systems and integration — Parts library (PLIB)
- ISO 15926, Industrial automation systems and integration — Integration of life-cycle data for process plants including oil and gas production facilities
- ISO 18629, Industrial automation systems and integration — Process specification language (PSL)
