= Common Procurement Vocabulary =

The Common Procurement Vocabulary (CPV) has been developed by the European Union to facilitate the processing of invitation to tender published in the Official Journal of the European Union (OJEU) by means of a single classification system to describe the subject matter of public contracts. It was established by Regulation (EC) No 2195/2002 of the European Parliament and of the Council on the Common Procurement Vocabulary (CPV) and amended by European Commission Regulation (EU) No. 213/2008 issued on 28 November 2007.

== Description ==
CPV codification consists of a main vocabulary which defines the subject of the contract, and a supplementary vocabulary to add further qualitative information. The main vocabulary is based on a tree structure made up with codes of up to 9 digits (an 8 digit code plus a check digit). This combination of digits is associated with a wording that describes the type of supplies, works or services defining the subject of the contract. A Call for Tender is quite often described by more than one CPV Code, aiming to give a better and more detailed description of the object of the contract. Commercial organisations promoting public contracts to their members or readers generally use CPV codes to identify business sectors likely to be interested in specific tenders, along with NUTS Codes which indicate the country and region within which the contract is to be performed.

An earlier form of standardised vocabulary in use in the United Kingdom before 1999 was known as the National Supplier Vocabulary.

Main Vocabulary classification structure

The numerical code consists of 8 digits, subdivided into:

Divisions: first two digits of the code XX000000-Y.

Groups: first three digits of the code XXX00000-Y.

Classes: first four digits of the code XXXX0000-Y.

Categories: first five digits of the code XXXXX000-Y.

== Examples ==
Some examples (taken from the 2008 amended version) are:

03113100-7 Sugar beet

03113200-8 Sugar cane

18451000-5 Buttons

18453000-9 Zip fasteners

71355000-1 Surveying services

71355200-3 Ordnance surveying

Each of the last three digits of the code allows to provide a more precise description of the subject within each category. The ninth digit, the so-called "control digit", verifies the previous eight ones, avoiding any possible error in the assignation of codes to the subject of public procurement

== Supplementary Vocabulary ==
Although the Supplementary Vocabulary is not always used, it can be added in certain cases to expand the description of the subject of a contract. It is made up of an alphanumeric code with a corresponding wording allowing further details to be added regarding the specific nature, purpose or context of the goods or services to be purchased: for example, specific metals may be designated e.g. AA08-2 (Tin) or AA09-5 (Zinc); food form may be designated e.g. BA04-1 (Fresh), BA06-7 (Hot) or BA24-1 (Frozen); and users or beneficiaries may be designated e.g. EA02-8 (for children) or EA07-3 (for pregnant women).

The Supplementary Vocabulary was reconstructed and enriched in the 2008 revision.

The alphanumeric code includes the following levels:

- first level comprising a letter corresponding to a section;
- second level comprising four digits: three to denote a subdivision and the last one for verification purposes.

== External sources ==
- Summaries of EU legislation > Internal market > Businesses in the internal market > Public procurement > Common procurement vocabulary
- CVP 2008 Explanatory Notes
- Information about European public procurement
- CPV-Code Search Engine & Supplier Directory
