= WSMO =

WSMO or Web Service Modeling Ontology is a conceptual model for relevant aspects related to Semantic Web Services. It provides an ontology based framework, which supports the deployment and interoperability of Semantic Web Services.

The WSMO has four main components:

- Goals - The client's objectives when consulting a Web Service.
- Ontologies - A formal Semantic description of the information used by all other components.
- Mediators - Connectors between componentes with mediation facilities. Provides interoperability between different ontologies.
- WebServices - Semantic description of Web Services. May include functional (Capability) and usage (Interface) descriptions.

The WSMO working group, part of the ESSI Cluster aligns the research and development efforts in the areas of Semantic Web Services between several European FP6 research projects.

WSMO working group includes the WSML working group, which aims at developing a language called Web Services Modeling Language (WSML) that formalizes the Web Services Modeling Ontology (WSMO).
