= Jack Revie =

Australian soccer coach

Personal information
- Full name: Jack Revie

Managerial career
- Years: Team
- 19??–19??: YMCA
- 1949: Australia
- 1950: Queensland

Jack Revie (fl. 1930) was an association football coach.

He founded and coached the YMCA football club in Brisbane.

In 1949, he coached the Australian national team for one game against Hajduk Split. The match ended in a 3–0 loss for Australia. He coached the Queensland representative side in 1950.
