= Pronto.com =

Pronto.com Inc.
- Company type: Subsidiary
- Industry: Internet Services : Comparison Shopping
- Founded: March 17th, 2005
- Headquarters: New York, NY, USA
- Key people: Darren MacDonald, CEO; Anthony Cassandra, CTO; Tamir Buchler, CRO
- Parent: IAC
- Website: www.pronto.com

Pronto.com is a price comparison service and a division of Barry Diller's company, IAC. Pronto was founded by IAC in 2005 as a downloadable software application that silently monitors all of a user's activity on a product page, then shows deals from other merchants on the same items, or similar ones, until it finds a better deal. In July 2006, Pronto launched the beta of its traditional Comparison shopping engine website which was made official in September 2006. According to Compete.com, a web traffic analysis company, Pronto.com was ranked the 7th fasting moving website for the period of December 2006 to December 2007.

In 2007, IAC redesigned Pronto.com, to incorporate social networking into the purchase of goods ranging from clothes, sports equipment and electronics. New features included letting users rate products, interact with others online, write their own reviews and join networks of shoppers with similar tastes. Pronto was the first major comparison shopping engine to launch 'social features.' According to Dan Marriott, then CEO of Pronto.com. "The new Pronto.com combines the best of social software and product search into an online shopping community that has not existed until today so consumers can visit one destination for the most fully informed shopping experience."

In 2009, Pronto.com launched vertical micro-sites starting with fashion, home and tech, followed by kids and baby. IAC also announced the appointment of Darren MacDonald as the new Chief Executive Officer of Pronto who would maintain strategic and operational oversight of the Pronto brands.

Pronto.com's first international venture began in 2010 with the launch of MegaDeal.jp geared towards the Japanese market. 2010 also saw the creation of the Pronto Content Network (PCN) known as The Writers Network. With this venture, IAC moved into the content mill space pioneered by the likes of Demand Media and Yahoo’s Associated Content, both of which employ thousands of freelancers who churn out enterprise articles - often of the "how-to" variety, and almost always Google search-friendly.

2011 saw the international expansion of Pronto.com into three more countries, starting with the launch of the German site 'Dealecke.de' in march. Followed by 'Superprix.com,' a site geared towards French users in July and the upcoming launch of its UK site 'DealHop' in October.

== See also ==
- Comparison shopping agent
- List of search engines
- Price comparison service
- Vertical search
