= Ernest Ibok Etim-Bassey =

Nigerian socialist, journalist, public servant, and politician

- Born: 1926; Ikoneto, Nigeria
- Died: 6 August 1998 (aged 71–72)
- Known for: Journalist, Editor and Managing Director – the Nigerian Peoples Press

Ernest Ibok Etim-Bassey (1926 – 6 August 1998) was a Nigerian socialist, journalist, public servant and politician who studied journalism at Moscow's Friendship University, in the former Soviet Union. He held the traditional title of Otu Ekong (War Commander) of Efikland. Born in Ikoneto, Odukpani LGA, Cross River State, Nigeria, in 1926. He died in Calabar on 6 August 1998 and was buried in Ikoneto on 25 October 1998.

== Career ==
Etim-Bassey was the first Chief Press Secretary at Government House, Calabar, under Governor Uduokaha Esuene. He was the managing editor of The Nigerian People, a radical newspaper based in Calabar, until it shut down due to financial problems in 1982.

Etim-Bassey was the chair, Cross River State Council of the Nigeria Union of Journalists; chair, Cross River/Akwa Ibom State Boundary Peace Committee; chair, Cross River State Farmers Association; chair, Nigerian Boxing Board of Control, Cross River State chapter; Nigeria Scout Commissioner for Cross River, Akwa Ibom, Abia, Bayelsa and Rivers States; he was also a member of Oil Minerals Producing Area Development Commission (OMPADEC).

== Personal life ==
Etim-Bassey was married to Ekanem Ene-Ndem Bassey (née Duke), a former Nigerian civil servant, journalist and diplomat, who died in May 1998. They had one son, William Ernest Etim-Bassey.
