= UNSPSC =

UN taxonomy of goods and services

The United Nations Standard Products and Services Code (UNSPSC) is a taxonomy of products and services for use in eCommerce. It is a four-level hierarchy coded as an eight-digit number, with an optional fifth level adding two more digits.

The latest release (August 14, 2023) of the code set is 26.0801.

The third newest UNv24.0301 release contains 740 changes to the previous UNSPSC version UNv23.0701 which are 721 new items added, 12 existing items edited, 6 existing items moved, and 1 existing item deleted. The new UNv24.0301 release contains 157,116 total items.

The changes include a new segment 57000000 — Humanitarian Relief Items, Kits, or Accessories, requested by United Nation Global Marketplace (UNGM); additional codes were added to support the United States Department of Agriculture's Specialty Crops Inspection at the U.S. border.

The UNSPSC competes with a number of other product and commodity coding schemes, including the European Union's Common Procurement Vocabulary, ECLASS, and GS1's Global Product Classification.

== History ==
The UNSPSC was organized upon the signature of a Memorandum of Understanding signed on September 29, 1998, by John S. Svendsen, the director of the Inter-agency Procurement Services Office (IAPSO) of the United Nations Development Programme (UNDP) and on November 1, 1998, by Lawrence M. Barth, a Vice President of the Dun & Bradstreet Corporation. The development of the first version was overseen by Peter R. Benson, who was also responsible for the design and development of the code management procedure as a modification of the Delphi statistical forecasting method. The process allowed for the rapid development of consensus without dominance or influence.

The ECCMA, a non-profit membership association, was formed in 1999 to manage and promote the UNSPSC until March 2003, with the release of version 6.0315. The UNDP then appointed GS1 US as code manager in May 2003 and ECCMA developed the ECCMA Open Technical Dictionary (eOTD) and the international standards ISO 22745 and ISO 8000.

Version	Number of Total Items
UNv26.0801	158,448
UNv25.0901	
UNv24.0301	157,116
UNv23.0701	156,936
UNv22.0601	156,478
UNv21.0901	
UNv20.0601	87,477
UNv19.0501	83,196
UNv18.0801	
UNv17.1001	77,350
UNv14.0801	49,069
UNv09.0501	21,718
UNv08.1201	19,038

== Description ==
The four primary levels of the code are: Segment, Family, Class and Commodity.

Each level is coded in two decimal digits, with '00' treated specially to give segments, families and classes their own eight-digit codes.

Level	Code	Description
Segment	10000000	Live Plant and Animal Material and Accessories and Supplies
Family	10100000	Live animals
Class	10101500	Livestock
Commodity	10101501	Cats

Thus 'Cats' are coded as 10101501, 'Dogs' are coded as 10101502 and 'Cattle' as 10101516. The class of 'Livestock' is 10101500; the family of 'Live animals' is 10100000, and all in the segment 10000000 of 'Live Plant and Animal Material and Accessories and Supplies'.

Level	Code	Description
Segment	44000000	Office Equipment, Accessories and Supplies
Family	44120000	Office supplies
Class	44121900	Ink and lead refills
Commodity	44121902	Lead refills

Optionally, a further two digits can be added for the business function, such as 'retail' or wholesale.

=== Top levels ===
The first two levels are as follows.

- UNSPSC
  - Raw Materials, Chemicals, Paper, Fuel
    - Live Plant and Animal Material and Accessories and Supplies
    - Mineral and Textile and Inedible Plant and Animal Materials
    - Chemicals including Bio Chemicals and Gas Materials
    - Resin and Rosin and Rubber and Foam and Film and Elastomeric Materials
    - Paper Materials and Products
    - Fuels and Fuel Additives and Lubricants and Anti corrosive Materials
  - Industrial Equipment & Tools
    - Mining and Well Drilling Machinery and Accessories
    - Farming and Fishing and Forestry and Wildlife Machinery and Accessories
    - Industrial Manufacturing and Processing Machinery and Accessories
    - Material Handling and Conditioning and Storage Machinery and their Accessories and Supplies
    - Power Generation and Distribution Machinery and Accessories
    - Tools and General
  - Components & Supplies
    - Structures and Building and Construction and Manufacturing Components and Supplies
    - Manufacturing Components and Supplies
    - Electronic Components and Supplies
    - Electrical Systems and Lighting and Components and Accessories and Supplies
  - Construction, Transportation & Facility Equipment & Supplies
    - Building and Construction Machinery and Accessories
    - Commercial and Military and Private Vehicles and their Accessories and Components
    - Distribution and Conditioning Systems and Equipment and Components
    - Land and Buildings and Structures and Thoroughfares
  - Medical, Laboratory & Test Equipment & Supplies & Pharmaceuticals
    - Laboratory and Measuring and Observing and Testing Equipment
    - Medical Equipment and Accessories and Supplies
    - Drugs and Pharmaceutical Products
  - Food, Cleaning & Service Industry Equipment & Supplies
    - Cleaning Equipment and Supplies
    - Service Industry Machinery and Equipment and Supplies
    - Food Beverage and Tobacco Products
  - Business, Communication & Technology Equipment & Supplies
    - Information Technology Broadcasting and Telecommunications
    - Office Equipment and Accessories and Supplies
    - Printing and Photographic and Audio and Visual Equipment and Supplies
    - Published Products
  - Defense, Security & Safety Equipment & Supplies
    - Defense and Law Enforcement and Security and Safety Equipment and Supplies
    - Humanitarian Relief Items, Kits, or Accessories
  - Personal, Domestic & Consumer Equipment & Supplies
    - Sports and Recreational Equipment and Supplies and Accessories
    - Domestic Appliances and Supplies and Consumer Electronic Products
    - Apparel and Luggage and Personal Care Products
    - Timepieces and Jewelry and Gemstone Products
    - Furniture and Furnishings
    - Musical Instruments and Games and Toys and Arts and Crafts and Educational Equipment and Materials and Accessories and Supplies
  - Services
    - Financial Instruments, Products, Contracts and Agreements
    - Bank offered products
    - Securities
    - Insurable interest contracts
    - Governmental property right conferrals
    - Farming and Fishing and Forestry and Wildlife Contracting Services
    - Mining and oil and gas services
    - Building and Facility Construction and Maintenance Services
    - Industrial Production and Manufacturing Services
    - Industrial Cleaning Services
    - Environmental Services
    - Transportation, Storage and Mail Services
    - Management and Business Professionals and Administrative Services
    - Engineering and Research and Technology Based Services
    - Editorial and Design and Graphic and Fine Art Services
    - Public Utilities and Public Sector Related Services
    - Financial and Insurance Services
    - Healthcare Services
    - Education and Training Services
    - Travel and Food, Lodging and Entertainment Services
    - Personal and Domestic Services
    - National Defense and Public Order and Security and Safety Services
    - Politics and Civic Affairs Services
    - Organizations and Clubs

== Governance ==
The UNSPSC was jointly developed by the United Nations Development Programme (UNDP) and Dun & Bradstreet in 1998 and was managed by GS1 US until 2024, then reverting to the UNDP, which is responsible for overseeing code change requests, revising the codes and issuing regularly scheduled updates to the code, as well as managing special projects and initiatives.

== Availability and languages ==
The codeset is available in English, French, German, Spanish, Italian, Japanese, Korean, Dutch, Mandarin Chinese, Portuguese, Danish, Norwegian, Swedish, and Hungarian. The latest PDF version of the codeset is available for download at no cost, though a user account is required and can be created (also at no cost). A version in Microsoft Excel format is available to members, who can also request changes and suggest additions to the code.

== See also ==
- Common Procurement Vocabulary
- Data Universal Numbering System (DUNS)
- eOTD
- ETIM
- Global Product Classification
- GS1
- International Standard Industrial Classification (ISIC)
- North American Industry Classification System (NAICS)
- Point code
- RosettaNet
- Standard Industrial Classification (SIC)
