= ECLASS =

Classification standard for products and services

ECLASS e.V.
- Type: registered association
- Founded: November 14, 2000
- Headquarters: Cologne, Germany
- Key people: Christine Beck-Sablonski, Chair of the Board
- Website: eclass.eu

ECLASS (formerly styled as eCl@ss) is a data standard for the classification of products and services using standardized ISO-compliant properties. The ECLASS Standard enables the digital exchange of product master data across industries, countries, languages, and organizations. It is widely used as a standardized basis for product group structures or with product-describing characteristics of master data, particularly in ERP systems.

In connection with the Digital Product Passport (DPP), information can be displayed within an Asset Administration Shell (AAS) using ECLASS structural elements, such as “Environmental Footprint,” “General Battery and Manufacturer Information,” or “Circularity and Resource Efficiency.”

As the only ISO-compliant and globally recognized feature-based classification standard, ECLASS serves as the “language” for Industry 4.0 and the Internet of Things (IoT).

== The association ==
=== Foundation and organization ===
ECLASS e.V. was founded on November 14, 2000 by 12 major companies in the German economy. Today, ECLASS e.V. has over 150 members from businesses, associations and public institutions around the world. As with physical products, a standard for the exchange of information between suppliers and customers is essential for electronic service procurement. A standard for the exchange of information between suppliers and customers is fundamental to the electronic procurement of services - just as it is for material products. ECLASS e.V. is a non-profit organization that defines, develops and distributes the cross-industry classification and master data standard of the same name internationally. ECLASS e.V. develops and maintains an internationally recognized standard for the consistent classification and description of products and services. The aim is to promote efficient, interoperable electronic data exchange across industries and countries. In this way, the association helps companies to digitize business processes and fulfil regulatory requirements, for example in the context of the digital product passport.

ECLASS e.V. was founded by the companies Siemens, BASF, Audi/VW, E.ON, SAP, Bayer AG, Degussa, Wacker Chemie, Infraserv Chemfidence and Solvay. Today, in addition to large international industrial companies, many medium-sized companies and public sector organizations such as the state of North Rhine-Westphalia and the Austrian Federal Procurement Agency, are also members.

=== Membership ===
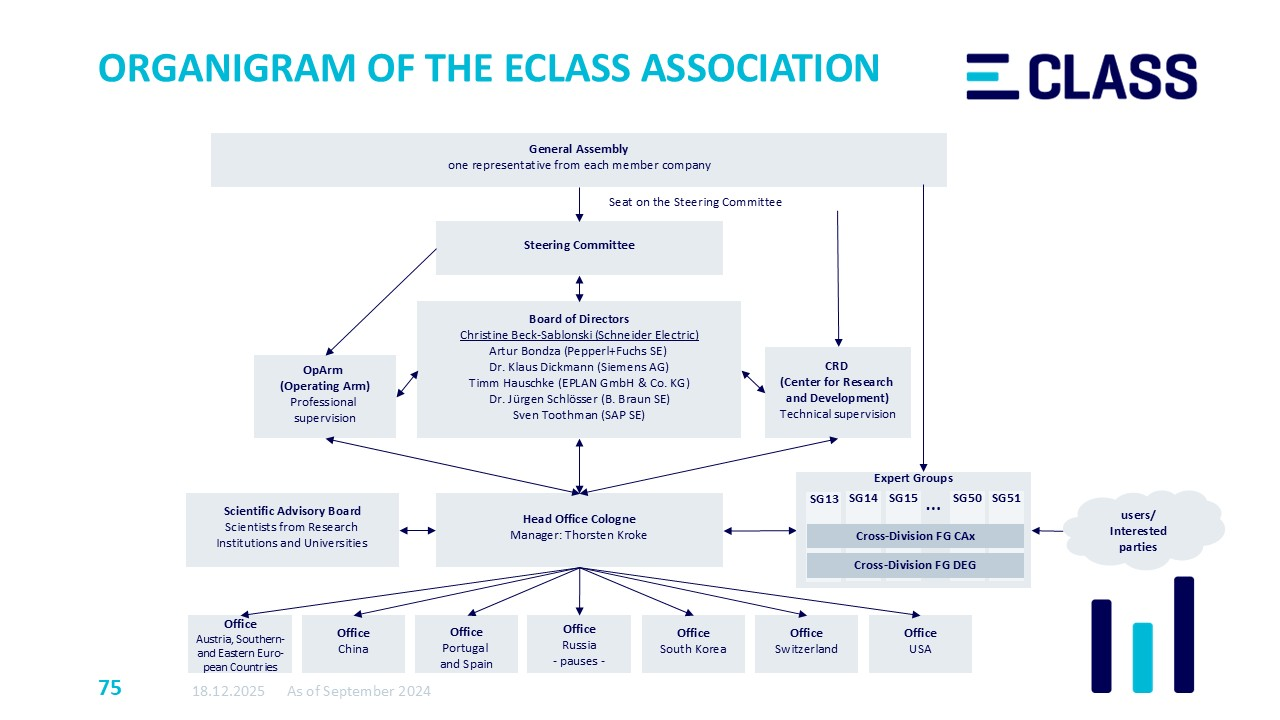
Structure of the association

The association offers the following memberships:

- Ordinary members: Ordinary members can be companies, associations or public bodies or regional authorities.
  - Organizations with more than 750 employees automatically receive a seat on the ECLASS Steering Committee as part of their regular membership. This committee is the association's central decision-making body and determines the strategic direction and key developments of the standard.
- Supporting members: The purpose of supporting membership is to give natural persons or companies the opportunity to get to know the work of the association, to support it financially and professionally and to receive suitable information on classification, standardization, etc. on the basis of a reduced membership fee.

In addition to the usual association bodies such as the General Assembly and the Board, the association also has the following bodies:

- Board: Responsible for the operational management and representation of the association.
- Center for Research and Development (CRD): The CRD is the central body at ECLASS responsible for the technical development of the ECLASS Standard. This includes tasks such as monitoring and maintaining the data structure, defining technical requirements and managing the Content Development Platform (CDP).
- Operating Arm (OpArm): The OpArm acts as a panel of experts that advises and supports the Executive Board. The OpArm prepares topics that are relevant for decisions, such as resolutions or strategic developments within the association.
- Steering Committee: The Steering Committee is the strategic decision-making body that determines the association’s content and economic orientation. Full members with more than 750 employees automatically receive a seat on the committee.

Business units and regional offices

The association operates a head office (ECLASS Head Office) to coordinate and carry out the operational and administrative activities assigned by the Executive Board. In addition to its head office in Germany (at the German Economic Institute), the ECLASS association maintains regional offices in Austria, Portugal, Spain, Switzerland, Northern Europe, China, South Korea and the USA.

=== Financing ===
The association is financed by membership fees and income from the distribution of the ECLASS Standard.

Each ordinary member pays an annual membership fee according to the size of their company. Supporting members pay a reduced fee. The specific amount of the membership fee is set out in the association's membership fee regulations.

The Standard requires a license. The costs for this are staggered according to the size of the company. ECLASS licenses can be purchased via the ECLASS website.

== The ECLASS Standard ==
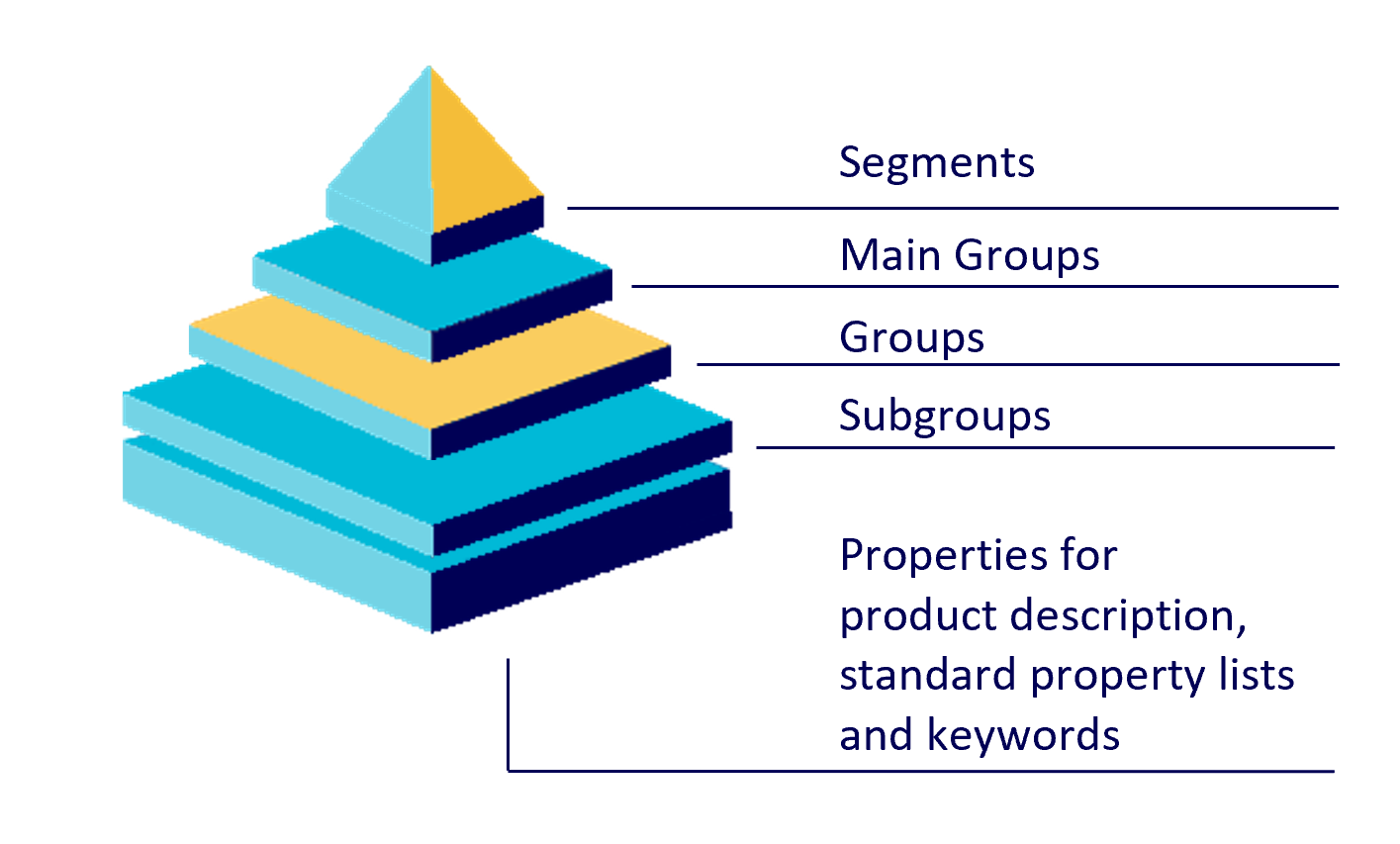
Classification hierarchy

The ECLASS standard is a hierarchical system, similar to the UNSPSC classification system, for grouping products and services. It consists of four levels of hierarchy (classes): Segment (Level 1), Main Group (Level 2), Group (Level 3) and Subgroup (Level 4). The hierarchy shows that a superordinate class comprises its subordinate classes, i.e. they are logically assigned to it.

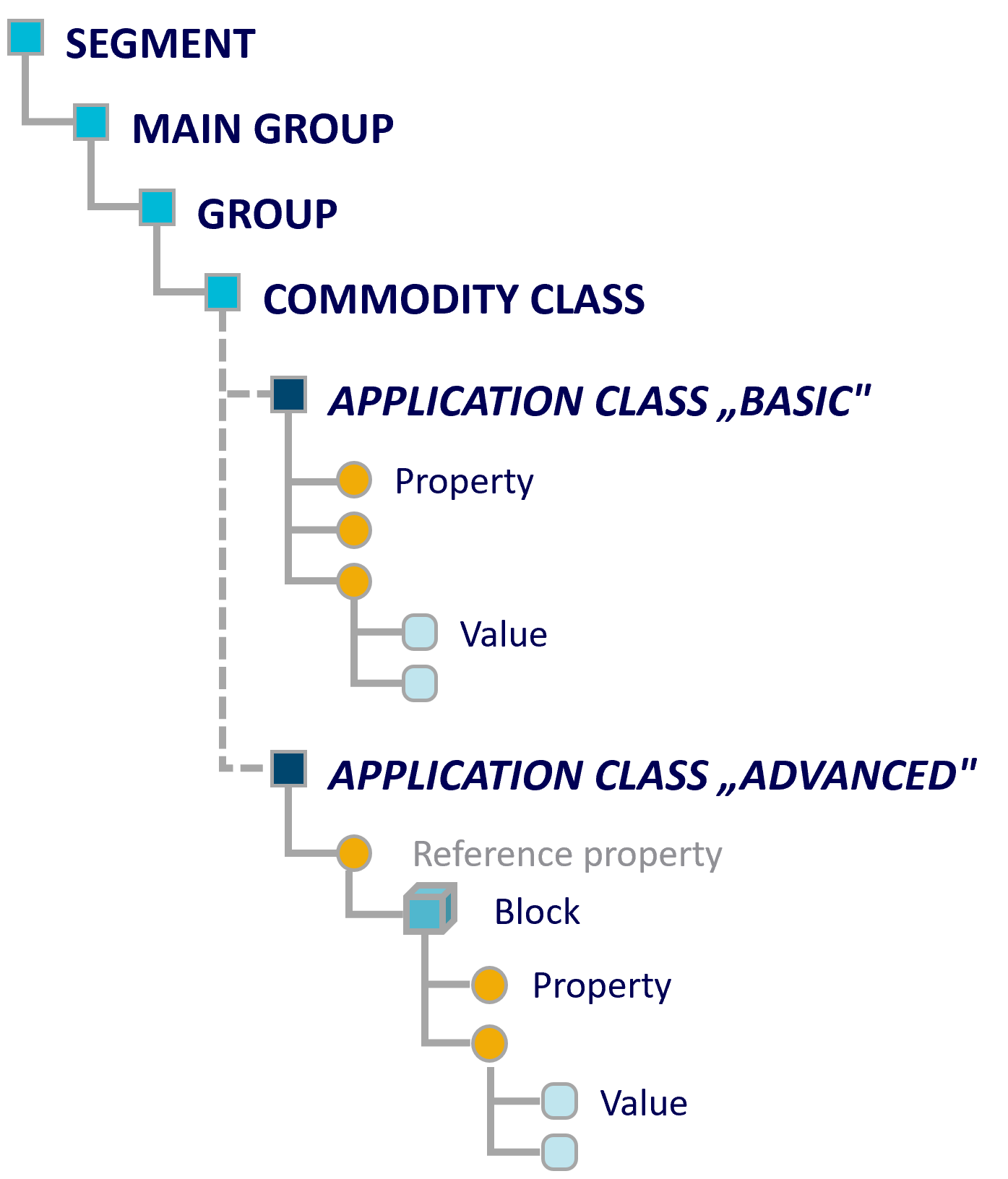
The tree structure illustrates the standardized and comparable structure of data.

The nodes of the tree structure are collectively referred to as material classes. On the 4th level (subgroup), ECLASS provides so-called property lists. Properties enable the detailed description of products and services in the associated master data and thus enable searching in the various catalogs. The properties are defined by values. Attached keywords and synonyms are used to quickly find the product classes and their property lists.

In summary, the system consists of the following elements:

- Classes - the classes or product groups allow products to be grouped and organized in this way.
- Keywords - keywords assigned to the individual classes simplify and standardize the search for products (e.g. product group "chairs" is also found with search terms such as "seat" or "office chair").
- Properties - Properties are additional product attributes that can only be used meaningfully for products in a specific class, for example the power of light bulbs or the diameter of tubes. The aim is to incorporate these properties into standardization, i.e. DIN, EN, ISO, DKE/IEC.
- Values - values specify the value range for the properties.
- Units - based on DIN and ECE units to specify the unit of the properties.

== International Standards ==
Both the processes for developing the standard and the derivation formats and data model fundamentals are based on international standards.

The ECLASS standard is being developed in accordance with ISO 8000-110, which defines requirements for the quality of master data and focuses in particular on transferability (interoperability), formal syntax and semantic coding. ECLASS supports ISO conformity through, among other things, technical specifications for established exchange standards (e.g., BMEcat, AutomationML, Asset Administration Shell), the use of IRDi identifiers (conceptual identifications) for semantic coding and the provision of the standard in formats such as CSV, XML and JSON.

== Versioning ==
The ECLASS Association publishes an updated version of the ECLASS Standard annually. Until 2021, releases followed a staggered schedule: Major Releases, which introduced structural changes, alternated with Minor Releases, which added new content without altering the structure.

To accelerate the development of the standard and respond more quickly to user requirements, the ECLASS Board decided to publish only Major Releases starting with ECLASS 12.0 (November 2021).

The current version, ECLASS 16.0 (November 2025), includes approximately 50,000 classes, 23,000 properties, and 140,000 keywords. Compared to the previous version, it adds 995 new classes (CC, AS, BL, AC), including 137 new classification classes (CCs), along with 1,253 new properties, 985 new values, and 126 new value lists. More than 155,000 Change Requests from users and experts were processed for this release.

Since version 15.0, ECLASS has been available in 31 languages, covering all official languages of the European Union and several other international languages.

ECLASS e.V. publishes machine-readable files (TUF and CUF) for each new version. This makes ECLASS the only standard worldwide that enables automatic - since machine-readable - migrations

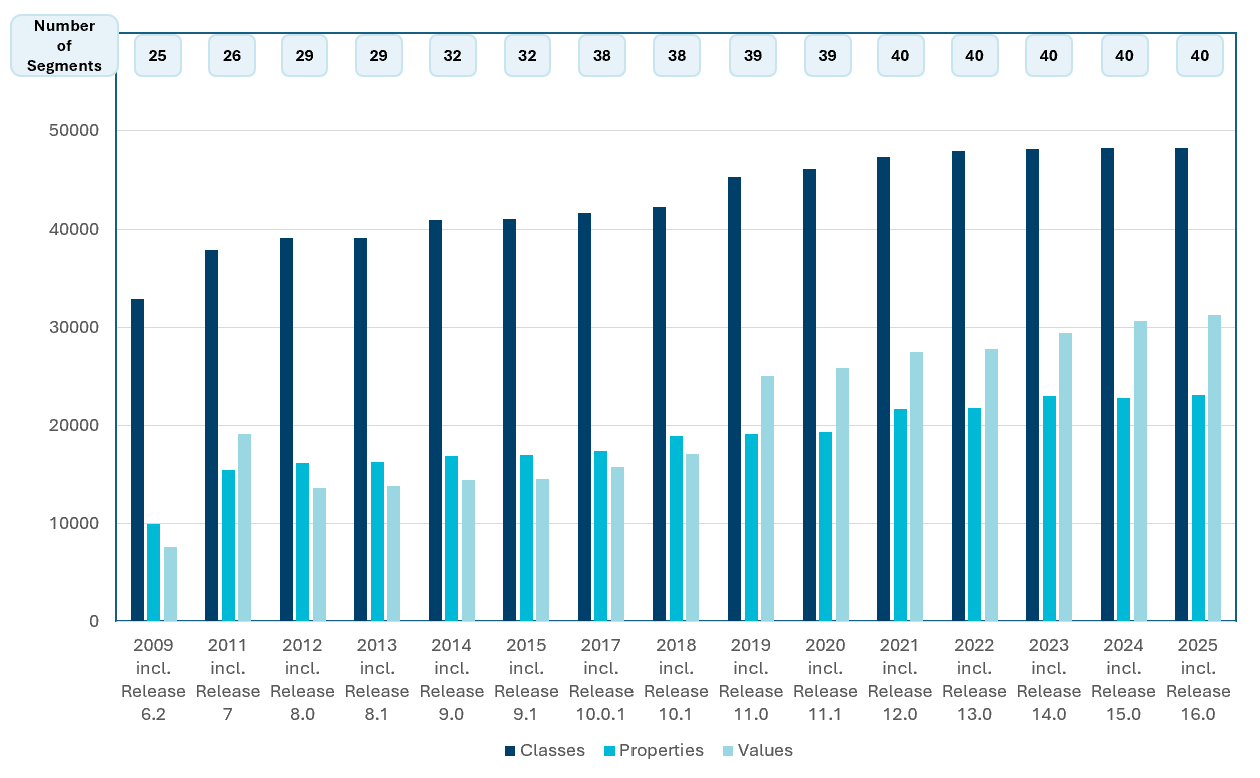
The diagram shows the development of the ECLASS Standard (as of 2025).

== Release development ==
Standard is based on ISO standards. Participation in the further development is free of charge for everyone. A free online portal, the ContentDevelopmentPlatform (CDP), is available for this purpose, where Change Requests can be submitted. There is also the opportunity to actively participate in Expert Groups.

== Benefits ==
Master data management is only possible with standardized master data. The ECLASS Standard offers benefits along the entire value chain:

- Reducing costs: With ECLASS, companies can make purchasing, merchandise management and sales more efficient by bundling volumes and streamlining the variety of goods.
- Open up international sales markets: Companies can digitally exchange product master data in 31 languages across all borders. ECLASS opens up electronic catalogs and digital marketplaces to users.
- Increasing productivity: ECLASS enables continuous processes, automated interfaces and standardized product information. This helps companies improve their ROI and time-to-market.
- Ensuring quality: Thanks to ECLASS, engineering and CAx data is exchanged across the board, efficiently and without data loss.
- Optimizing processes sustainably: Harmonized data along the entire value chain - from development to production and sales to maintenance - saves companies time and money.
- Staying future-proof: ECLASS offers semantic interoperability and is thus the basis for machine-to-machine communication, I4.0 applications, the digital twin and the Digital Product Passport (DPP).

== Cooperation with other organizations ==
Since January 1, 2006, ETIM has been a member of ECLASS and vice versa. ETIM Deutschland e.V. (from German: ElektroTechnisches InformationsModell) is an initiative to standardize the electronic exchange of product data in the field of electrical engineering. Both organizations have set themselves the goal of harmonizing ETIM with the ECLASS Standard and are working together with VDMA, ZVEI and DIN, among others. Prolist International e.V. was merged into ECLASS e.V. on January 1, 2013.

ECLASS is a member of the Industrial Digital Twin Association (IDTA). The aim of the collaboration is to support the Asset Administration Shell (AAS) as a central element of the digital twin with standardized, machine-readable data from ECLASS. This allows the properties and classification of the ECLASS Standard to be integrated directly into the AAS, which promotes interoperability between systems and creates a uniform semantic basis for Industry 4.0 applications.

== Distribution ==
Around 5,000 companies worldwide are already successfully using the ECLASS Standard for digital data exchange across all borders. ECLASS is used in industry, commerce, trade and the service sector. The current 40 segments (as of 2025) include, for example, construction, logistics, food, medicine, optics, automotive, laboratory technology and office supplies. In addition to large international companies such as Siemens, SAP, VW-Audi and BASF, the German medical sector, for example, has opted for ECLASS as the classification standard for electronic data exchange. It is also used in public procurement, e.g. by the purchasing department of the federal government and some federal states of Germany.

In 2002, the Fraunhofer Institute for Industrial Engineering published a survey according to which 34.9% of the 296 companies surveyed used a standard product classification system, of which 32.4% used ECLASS, i.e. 11.3% in absolute terms. This put ECLASS ahead of ETIM (6.6%) and UNSPSC (3.8%) in Germany.

== Literature ==
- Hepp, Martin; Leukel, Joerg; Schmitz, Volker (2007). "A quantitative analysis of product categorization standards: content, coverage, and maintenance of eCl@ss, UNSPSC, eOTD, and the RosettaNet Technical Dictionary". Knowledge and Information Systems. 13 (1): 77–144. doi:10.1007/s10115-006-0054-2. ISSN 0219-1377.
- Hepp, Martin (2003). Güterklassifikation als semantisches Standardisierungsproblem (in German). Wiesbaden: Dt. Univ.-Verl. ISBN 3-8244-7932-X.
- Brenner, Wolfgang; Galuschka, Tina (2008). Klassifizierung in der Praxis (in German). Melsungen: A. Bernecker Verlag. ISBN 978-3-87064-129-0.
