= ETIM (standard) =

ETIM (ETIM Technical Information Model) is an open standard for the unambiguous grouping and specification of products in the technical sector through a uniform classification system.

It is an initiative started to standardize the electronic exchange of product data for technical products, to enable the electronic trading of these products. Over time the scope has widened, now also including product information requirements for building information modeling (BIM).

== ETIM classification ==
This classification uses: product classes, features, values and synonyms (keywords) that make it easy to find the right product. Within the product class, comparable or "alike" products are classified together.

The product classification itself is no “final product” but offers a structure for an electronic product database and applications such as an online web shop, search engine or configuration software. ETIM classification is multilingual, media neutral and supplier neutral.

This standardization allows suppliers of technical products to be found on the basis of class name (including synonyms) or by technical features.

== ETIM organisation ==
The association ETIM International is the supporting and governing body in which ETIM members worldwide are united. The association has its official seat in Brussels, Belgium. ETIM is represented locally in over 20 countries across the globe by national ETIM Country Organisations.

Status 2020, there are local ETIM organizations in Austria, Belgium, Denmark, Estonia, Finland, France, Germany, Hungary, Italy, Lithuania, the Netherlands, North America (USA/Canada/Mexico), Norway, Poland, Portugal, Russia, Slovakia, Slovenia, Spain, Sweden, Switzerland and UK.

== Release Format ==
The content of the ETIM model is identical in all member countries, which means that any ETIM class in use in a country has exactly the same features with the same identifying code for all the countries. ETIM has developed a uniform international release format based on XML, a modern and flexible carrier for the ETIM model. The ETIM IXF format is multilingual, so it can contain multiple language versions of the ETIM model in one file. For the complete and detailed format description we refer to the separate document on ETIM IXF. .

== Exchange Format Product Data ==
The ETIM data model is completely uniform, differing only in the language. The exchange format for classified product data, not to be confused with the release format for the data model, however is set and defined by each local ETIM organization individually. ETIM International recommends the BMEcat® standard, which is the most common exchange format within the ETIM countries. However, in some countries specific national formats are still in use and accepted as sector standard, sometimes in addition to BMEcat®.

== ETIM versions ==
- The "ETIM Clearing Center - Specification Product Data Exchange Format Version 1.02" uses BMEcat 1.01 as the basis.
- ETIM BMEcat 1.2 contains the ETIM-2.0 specification and is adapted to BMEcat 1.2.
- ETIM version 3.0, 30 May 2005, in German and English.
- ETIM version 4.0, 15 January 2008, in German, English and Dutch.
- On 27 March 2008, a corrected version was published. The changes apply only to some units.
- ETIM version 5.0, May 2011.
- ETIM version 6.0, 29 April 2014
- ETIM version 7.0, 4 September 2017
- ETIM version 8.0, 3 November 2020
- ETIM version 9.0, 5 December 2022
- ETIM version 10.0, 5 December 2024
